The Vietnam War (also known by other names) was a conflict in Vietnam, Laos, and Cambodia from 1 November 1955 to the fall of Saigon on 30 April 1975. It was the second of the Indochina Wars and was officially fought between North Vietnam and South Vietnam. The north was supported by the Soviet Union, China, and other communist states, while the south was supported by the United States and other anti-communist allies. The war is widely considered to be a Cold War-era proxy war. It lasted almost 20 years, with direct U.S. involvement ending in 1973. The conflict also spilled over into neighboring states, exacerbating the Laotian Civil War and the Cambodian Civil War, which ended with all three countries becoming communist states by 1975.

After the French military withdrawal from Indochina in 1954 – following their defeat in the First Indochina War – the Viet Minh took control of North Vietnam, and the U.S. assumed financial and military support for the South Vietnamese state. The Viet Cong (VC), a South Vietnamese common front under the direction of the north, initiated a guerrilla war in the south. The People's Army of Vietnam (PAVN), also known as the North Vietnamese Army (NVA), engaged in more conventional warfare with U.S. and South Vietnamese forces (ARVN). North Vietnam invaded Laos in 1958, establishing the Ho Chi Minh Trail to supply and reinforce the VC. By 1963, the north had sent 40,000 soldiers to fight in the south. U.S. involvement increased under President John F. Kennedy, from just under a thousand military advisors in 1959 to 23,000 by 1964.

Following the Gulf of Tonkin incident in August 1964, the U.S. Congress passed a resolution that gave President Lyndon B. Johnson broad authority to increase U.S. military presence in Vietnam, without a formal declaration of war. Johnson ordered the deployment of combat units for the first time, and dramatically increased the number of American troops to 184,000. U.S. and South Vietnamese forces relied on air superiority and overwhelming firepower to conduct search and destroy operations, involving ground forces, artillery, and airstrikes. The U.S. also conducted a large-scale strategic bombing campaign against North Vietnam, and continued significantly building up its forces, despite little progress being made. In 1968, North Vietnamese forces launched the Tet Offensive; though it was a military defeat for them, it became a political victory, as it caused U.S. domestic support for the war to fade. By the end of the year, the VC held little territory and were sidelined by the PAVN.  In 1969, North Vietnam declared the Provisional Revolutionary Government of the Republic of South Vietnam. Operations crossed national borders, and the U.S. bombed North Vietnamese supply routes in Laos and Cambodia. The 1970 deposing of the Cambodian monarch, Norodom Sihanouk, resulted in a PAVN invasion of the country (at the request of the Khmer Rouge), and then a U.S.-ARVN counter-invasion, escalating the Cambodian Civil War. After the election of Richard Nixon in 1969, a policy of "Vietnamization" began, which saw the conflict fought by an expanded ARVN, while U.S. forces withdrew in the face of increasing domestic opposition. U.S. ground forces had largely withdrawn by early 1972, and their operations were limited to air support, artillery support, advisors, and materiel shipments. The Paris Peace Accords of January 1973 saw all U.S. forces withdrawn; accords were broken almost immediately, and fighting continued for two more years. Phnom Penh fell to the Khmer Rouge on 17 April 1975, while the 1975 spring offensive saw the Fall of Saigon to the PAVN on 30 April, marking the end of the war; North and South Vietnam were reunified the following year.

The war exacted an enormous human cost: estimates of the number of Vietnamese soldiers and civilians killed range from 966,000 to 3 million. Some 275,000–310,000 Cambodians, 20,000–62,000 Laotians, and 58,220 U.S. service members also died in the conflict. The end of the Vietnam War would precipitate the Vietnamese boat people and the larger Indochina refugee crisis, which saw millions of refugees leave Indochina, an estimated 250,000 of whom perished at sea. Once in power, the Khmer Rouge carried out the Cambodian genocide, while conflict between them and the unified Vietnam would eventually escalate into the Cambodian–Vietnamese War, which toppled the Khmer Rouge government in 1979. In response, China invaded Vietnam, with subsequent border conflicts lasting until 1991. Within the United States, the war gave rise to what was referred to as Vietnam Syndrome, a public aversion to American overseas military involvements, which, together with the Watergate scandal contributed to the crisis of confidence that affected America throughout the 1970s.

Names

Various names have been applied to the conflict. "Vietnam War" is the most commonly used name in English. It has also been called the "Second Indochina War" and the "Vietnam conflict".

Given that there have been several conflicts in Indochina, this particular conflict is known by its primary protagonists' names to distinguish it from others. In Vietnam, the war is generally known as the "Resistance war against the United States". It is also sometimes called the "American War".

Background 

The primary military organizations involved in the war were the United States Armed Forces and the Army of the Republic of Vietnam, pitted against the People's Army of Vietnam (PAVN) (commonly called the North Vietnamese Army, or NVA, in English-language sources) and the National Front for the Liberation of South Vietnam (NLF, more commonly known as the Viet Cong (VC) in English language sources), a South Vietnamese communist guerrilla force.

Indochina had been a French colony from the late 19th century to the mid-20th century. When the Japanese invaded during World War II, the Viet Minh, a Communist-led common front under the leadership of Ho Chi Minh, opposed them with support from the US, the Soviet Union and China. They received some Japanese arms when Japan surrendered. On V-J Day, 2 September, Ho Chi Minh proclaimed in Hanoi the establishment of the Democratic Republic of Vietnam (DRV). The DRV ruled as the only civil government in all of Vietnam for 20 days, after the abdication of Emperor Bảo Đại, who had governed under the Japanese rule. On 23 September 1945, French forces overthrew the local DRV government, and declared French authority restored. The French gradually retook control of Indochina. Following unsuccessful negotiations, the Viet Minh initiated an insurgency against French rule. Hostilities escalated into the First Indochina War (beginning in December 1946).

By the 1950s, the conflict had become entwined with the Cold War. In January 1950, China and the Soviet Union recognized the Viet Minh's Democratic Republic of Vietnam, based in Hanoi, as the legitimate government of Vietnam. The following month the United States and Great Britain recognized the French-backed State of Vietnam in Saigon, led by former Emperor Bảo Đại, as the legitimate Vietnamese government. The outbreak of the Korean War in June 1950 convinced many Washington policymakers that the war in Indochina was an example of communist expansionism directed by the Soviet Union.

Military advisors from China began assisting the Viet Minh in July 1950. PRC weapons, expertise, and laborers transformed the Viet Minh from a guerrilla force into a regular army. In September 1950, the United States created a Military Assistance and Advisory Group (MAAG) to screen French requests for aid, advise on strategy, and train Vietnamese soldiers. By 1954, the United States had spent $1 billion in support of the French military effort, shouldering 80 percent of the cost of the war.

During the Battle of Dien Bien Phu (1954), U.S. carriers sailed to the Gulf of Tonkin and the U.S. conducted reconnaissance flights. France and the United States also discussed the use of three tactical nuclear weapons, although reports of how seriously this was considered and by whom are vague and contradictory. According to then-Vice President Richard Nixon, the Joint Chiefs of Staff drew up plans to use small tactical nuclear weapons to support the French. Nixon, a so-called "hawk" on Vietnam, suggested that the United States might have to "put American boys in". President Dwight D. Eisenhower made American participation contingent on British support, but the British were opposed. Eisenhower, wary of involving the United States in a land war in Asia, decided against military intervention. Throughout the conflict, U.S. intelligence estimates remained skeptical of France's chance of success.

On 7 May 1954, the French garrison at Dien Bien Phu surrendered. The defeat marked the end of French military involvement in Indochina. At the Geneva Conference, the French negotiated a ceasefire agreement with the Viet Minh, and independence was granted to Cambodia, Laos, and Vietnam.

Transition period

At the 1954 Geneva Conference, Vietnam was temporarily partitioned at the 17th parallel. Ho Chi Minh had wished to continue the war in the south, but was restrained by his Chinese allies who convinced him that he could win control by electoral means. Under the terms of the Geneva Accords, civilians were allowed to move freely between the two provisional states for a 300-day period. Elections throughout the country were to be held in 1956 to establish a unified government. Around one million northerners, mainly minority Catholics, fled south, fearing persecution by the Communists. This followed an American psychological warfare campaign, designed by Edward Lansdale for the Central Intelligence Agency (CIA), which exaggerated anti-Catholic sentiment among the Viet Minh and which falsely claimed the US was about to drop atomic bombs on Hanoi. The exodus was coordinated by a U.S.-funded $93 million relocation program, which included the use of the Seventh Fleet to ferry refugees. The northern, mainly Catholic refugees gave the later Ngô Đình Diệm regime a strong anti-communist constituency. Diệm staffed his government's key posts mostly with northern and central Catholics.

In addition to the Catholics flowing south, over 130,000 "Revolutionary Regroupees" went to the north for "regroupment", expecting to return to the south within two years. The Viet Minh left roughly 5,000 to 10,000 cadres in the south as a base for future insurgency. The last French soldiers left South Vietnam in April 1956. The PRC completed its withdrawal from North Vietnam at around the same time.

Between 1953 and 1956, the North Vietnamese government instituted various agrarian reforms, including "rent reduction" and "land reform", which resulted in significant political oppression. During the land reform, testimony from North Vietnamese witnesses suggested a ratio of one execution for every 160 village residents, which extrapolated resulted in an initial estimation of nearly 100,000 executions nationwide. Because the campaign was concentrated mainly in the Red River Delta area, a lower estimate of 50,000 executions became widely accepted by scholars at the time. However, declassified documents from the Vietnamese and Hungarian archives indicate that the number of executions was much lower than reported at the time, although likely greater than 13,500. In 1956, leaders in Hanoi admitted to "excesses" in implementing this program and restored a large amount of the land to the original owners.

The south, meanwhile, constituted the State of Vietnam, with Bảo Đại as Emperor and Ngô Đình Diệm (appointed in July 1954) as his prime minister. Neither the United States government nor Ngô Đình Diệm's State of Vietnam signed anything at the 1954 Geneva Conference. With respect to the question of reunification, the non-communist Vietnamese delegation objected strenuously to any division of Vietnam, but lost out when the French accepted the proposal of Viet Minh delegate Phạm Văn Đồng, who proposed that Vietnam eventually be united by elections under the supervision of "local commissions". The United States countered with what became known as the "American Plan", with the support of South Vietnam and the United Kingdom. It provided for unification elections under the supervision of the United Nations, but was rejected by the Soviet delegation. The United States said, "With respect to the statement made by the representative of the State of Vietnam, the United States reiterates its traditional position that peoples are entitled to determine their own future and that it will not join in any arrangement which would hinder this".
U.S. President Dwight D. Eisenhower wrote in 1954:

In 1957, independent observers from India, Poland, and Canada representing the International Control Commission (ICC) stated that fair, unbiased elections were not possible, with the ICC reporting that neither South nor North Vietnam had honored the armistice agreement.

From April to June 1955, Diệm eliminated any political opposition in the south by launching military operations against two religious groups: the Cao Đài and Hòa Hảo of Ba Cụt. The campaign also focused on the Bình Xuyên organized crime group, which was allied with members of the communist party secret police and had some military elements. The group was ultimately defeated in April following a battle in Saigon. As broad-based opposition to his harsh tactics mounted, Diệm increasingly sought to blame the communists.

In a referendum on the future of the State of Vietnam on 23 October 1955, Diệm rigged the poll supervised by his brother Ngô Đình Nhu and was credited with 98.2 percent of the vote, including 133% in Saigon. His American advisors had recommended a more "modest" winning margin of "60 to 70 percent." Diệm, however, viewed the election as a test of authority. Three days later, he declared South Vietnam to be an independent state under the name Republic of Vietnam (ROV), with himself as president. Likewise, Ho Chi Minh and other communist officials always won at least 99% of the vote in North Vietnamese "elections".

The domino theory, which argued that if one country fell to communism, then all of the surrounding countries would follow, was first proposed as policy by the Eisenhower administration. John F. Kennedy, then a U.S. senator, said in a speech to the American Friends of Vietnam: "Burma, Thailand, India, Japan, the Philippines and obviously Laos and Cambodia are among those whose security would be threatened if the Red Tide of Communism overflowed into Vietnam."

Diệm era, 1954–1963

Rule

A devout Roman Catholic, Diệm was fervently anti-communist, nationalist, and socially conservative. Historian Luu Doan Huynh notes that "Diệm represented narrow and extremist nationalism coupled with autocracy and nepotism." Most Vietnamese people were Buddhist, and they were alarmed by Diệm's actions, like his dedication of the country to the Virgin Mary.

Beginning in the summer of 1955, Diệm launched the "Denounce the Communists" campaign, during which suspected communists and other anti-government elements were arrested, imprisoned, tortured, or executed. He instituted the death penalty against any activity deemed communist in August 1956. The North Vietnamese government claimed that, by November 1957, over 65,000 individuals were imprisoned and 2,148 were killed in the process. According to Gabriel Kolko, 40,000 political prisoners had been jailed by the end of 1958.

In October 1956, Diệm launched a land reform program limiting the size of rice farms per owner. More than 1.8m acres of farm land became available for purchase by landless people. By 1960, the land reform process had stalled because many of Diem's biggest supporters were large land owners.

In May 1957, Diệm undertook a ten-day state visit to the United States. President Eisenhower pledged his continued support, and a parade was held in Diệm's honor in New York City. Although Diệm was publicly praised, Secretary of State John Foster Dulles privately conceded that Diệm had to be backed because they could find no better alternative.

Insurgency in the South, 1954–1960

Between 1954 and 1957, the Diệm government succeeded in preventing large-scale organized unrest in the countryside. In April 1957, insurgents launched an assassination campaign, referred to as "extermination of traitors". Seventeen people were killed in  an attack at a bar in Châu Đốc in July, and in September a district chief was killed with his family on a highway. By early 1959, however, Diệm had come to regard the (increasingly frequent) violence as an organized campaign and implemented Law 10/59, which made political violence punishable by death and property confiscation. There had been some division among former Viet Minh whose main goal was to hold the elections promised in the Geneva Accords, leading to "wildcat" activities separate from the other communists and anti-GVN activists. Douglas Pike estimated that insurgents carried out 2,000 abductions, and 1,700 assassinations of government officials, village chiefs, hospital workers and teachers from 1957 to 1960. Violence between the insurgents and government forces increased drastically from 180 clashes in January 1960 to 545 clashes in September.

In September 1960, COSVN, North Vietnam's southern headquarters, gave an order for a full scale coordinated uprising in South Vietnam against the government and 1/3 of the population was soon living in areas of communist control. In December 1960, North Vietnam formally created the Viet Cong with the intent of uniting all anti-GVN insurgents, including non-communists. It was formed in Memot, Cambodia, and directed through COSVN. According to the Pentagon Papers, the Viet Cong "placed heavy emphasis on the withdrawal of American advisors and influence, on land reform and liberalization of the GVN, on coalition government and the neutralization of Vietnam." The identities of the leaders of the organization often were kept secret.

Support for the VC was driven by resentment of Diem's reversal of Viet Minh land reforms in the countryside. The Viet Minh had confiscated large private landholdings, reduced rents and debts, and leased communal lands, mostly to poorer peasants. Diem brought the landlords back to the villages. People who had been farming land for years had to return it to landlords and pay years of back rent. Marilyn B. Young wrote that "The divisions within villages reproduced those that had existed against the French: 75 percent support for the NLF, 20 percent trying to remain neutral and 5 percent firmly pro-government".

North Vietnamese involvement

In March 1956, southern communist leader Lê Duẩn presented a plan to revive the insurgency entitled "The Road to the South" to the other members of the Politburo in Hanoi; however, as both China and the Soviets opposed confrontation at this time, Lê Duẩn's plan was rejected. Despite this, the North Vietnamese leadership approved tentative measures to revive the southern insurgency in December 1956. This decision was made at the 11th Plenary Session of the Lao Dong Central Committee. Communist forces were under a single command structure set up in 1958. In May 1958, North Vietnamese forces seized the transportation hub at Tchepone in Southern Laos near the demilitarized zone between North and South Vietnam.

The North Vietnamese Communist Party approved a "people's war" on the South at a session in January 1959, and, in May, Group 559 was established to maintain and upgrade the Ho Chi Minh trail, at this time a six-month mountain trek through Laos. On 28 July, North Vietnamese and Pathet Lao forces invaded Laos, fighting the Royal Lao Army all along the border. Group 559 was headquartered in Na Kai, Houaphan province in northeast Laos close to the border. About 500 of the "regroupees" of 1954 were sent south on the trail during its first year of operation. The first arms delivery via the trail was completed in August 1959. In April 1960, North Vietnam imposed universal military conscription for adult males. About 40,000 communist soldiers infiltrated the south from 1961 to 1963.

Kennedy's escalation, 1961–1963

In the 1960 U.S. presidential election, Senator John F. Kennedy defeated incumbent Vice President Richard M. Nixon. Although Eisenhower warned Kennedy about Laos and Vietnam, Europe and Latin America "loomed larger than Asia on his sights." In April 1961, Kennedy approved the Bay of Pigs Invasion, which ended in failure. In June 1961, he bitterly disagreed with Soviet premier Nikita Khrushchev when they met in Vienna to discuss key U.S.–Soviet issues. Only 16 months later, the Cuban Missile Crisis (16–28 October 1962) played out on television worldwide. It was the closest the Cold War came to escalating into a full-scale nuclear war, and the U.S. raised the readiness level of Strategic Air Command (SAC) forces to DEFCON 2.

The Kennedy administration remained essentially committed to the Cold War foreign policy inherited from the Truman and Eisenhower administrations. In 1961, the U.S. had 50,000 troops based in South Korea, and Kennedy faced four crisis situations: the failure of the Bay of Pigs Invasion that he had approved on 4 April, settlement negotiations between the pro-Western government of Laos and the Pathet Lao communist movement in May ("Kennedy sidestepped Laos, whose rugged terrain was no battleground for American soldiers."), the construction of the Berlin Wall in August, and the Cuban Missile Crisis in October. Kennedy believed that yet another failure to gain control and stop communist expansion would irreparably damage U.S. credibility. He was determined to "draw a line in the sand" and prevent a communist victory in Vietnam. He told James Reston of The New York Times immediately after his Vienna summit meeting with Khrushchev, "Now we have a problem making our power credible and Vietnam looks like the place."

Kennedy's policy toward South Vietnam assumed that Diệm and his forces had to ultimately defeat the guerrillas on their own. He was against the deployment of American combat troops and observed that "to introduce U.S. forces in large numbers there today, while it might have an initially favorable military impact, would almost certainly lead to adverse political and, in the long run, adverse military consequences." The quality of the South Vietnamese military, however, remained poor. Poor leadership, corruption, and political promotions all played a part in weakening the ARVN. The frequency of guerrilla attacks rose as the insurgency gathered steam. While Hanoi's support for the Viet Cong played a role, South Vietnamese governmental incompetence was at the core of the crisis.

One major issue Kennedy raised was whether the Soviet space and missile programs had surpassed those of the United States. Although Kennedy stressed long-range missile parity with the Soviets, he was also interested in using special forces for counterinsurgency warfare in Third World countries threatened by communist insurgencies. Although they were originally intended for use behind front lines after a conventional Soviet invasion of Europe, Kennedy believed that the guerrilla tactics employed by special forces such as the Green Berets would be effective in a "brush fire" war in Vietnam.

Kennedy advisors Maxwell Taylor and Walt Rostow recommended that U.S. troops be sent to South Vietnam disguised as flood relief workers. Kennedy rejected the idea but increased military assistance yet again. In April 1962, John Kenneth Galbraith warned Kennedy of the "danger we shall replace the French as a colonial force in the area and bleed as the French did." Eisenhower's put 900 advisors in Vietnam, and by November 1963, Kennedy had put 16,000 American military personnel in Vietnam.

The Strategic Hamlet Program was initiated in late 1961. This joint U.S.–South Vietnamese program attempted to resettle the rural population into fortified villages. It was implemented in early 1962 and involved some forced relocation and segregation of rural South Vietnamese into new communities where the peasantry would be isolated from the Viet Cong. It was hoped these new communities would provide security for the peasants and strengthen the tie between them and the central government. However, by November 1963 the program had waned, and it officially ended in 1964.

On 23 July 1962, fourteen nations, including China, South Vietnam, the Soviet Union, North Vietnam and the United States, signed an agreement promising to respect the neutrality of Laos.

Ousting and assassination of Ngô Đình Diệm

The inept performance of the ARVN was exemplified by failed actions such as the Battle of Ấp Bắc on 2 January 1963, in which a small band of Viet Cong won a battle against a much larger and better-equipped South Vietnamese force, many of whose officers seemed reluctant even to engage in combat. During the battle the South Vietnamese had lost 83 soldiers and 5 US war helicopters serving to ferry ARVN troops that had been shot down by Vietcong forces, while the Vietcong forces had lost only 18 soldiers. The ARVN forces were led by Diệm's most trusted general, Huỳnh Văn Cao, commander of the IV Corps. Cao was a Catholic who had been promoted due to religion and fidelity rather than skill, and his main job was to preserve his forces to stave off coup attempts; he had earlier vomited during a communist attack. Some policymakers in Washington began to conclude that Diệm was incapable of defeating the communists and might even make a deal with Ho Chi Minh. He seemed concerned only with fending off coups and had become more paranoid after attempts in 1960 and 1962, which he partly attributed to U.S. encouragement. As Robert F. Kennedy noted, "Diệm wouldn't make even the slightest concessions. He was difficult to reason with..." Historian James Gibson summed up the situation:

Discontent with Diệm's policies exploded in May 1963 following the Huế Phật Đản shootings of nine unarmed Buddhists protesting against the ban on displaying the Buddhist flag on Vesak, the Buddha's birthday. This resulted in mass protests against discriminatory policies that gave privileges to the Catholic Church and its adherents over the Buddhist majority. Diệm's elder brother Ngô Đình Thục was the Archbishop of Huế and aggressively blurred the separation between church and state. Thuc's anniversary celebrations occurred shortly before Vesak had been bankrolled by the government, and Vatican flags were displayed prominently. There had also been reports of Catholic paramilitaries demolishing Buddhist pagodas throughout Diệm's rule. Diệm refused to make concessions to the Buddhist majority or take responsibility for the deaths. On 21 August 1963, the ARVN Special Forces of Colonel Lê Quang Tung, loyal to Diệm's younger brother Ngô Đình Nhu, raided pagodas across Vietnam, causing widespread damage and destruction and leaving a death toll estimated to range into the hundreds.

U.S. officials began discussing the possibility of a regime change during the middle of 1963. The United States Department of State wanted to encourage a coup, while the Defense Department favored Diệm. Chief among the proposed changes was the removal of Diệm's younger brother Nhu, who controlled the secret police and special forces, and was seen as the man behind the Buddhist repression and more generally the architect of the Ngô family's rule. This proposal was conveyed to the U.S. embassy in Saigon in Cable 243.

The CIA contacted generals planning to remove Diệm and told them that the United States would not oppose such a move nor punish the generals by cutting off aid. President Diệm was overthrown and executed, along with his brother, on 2 November 1963. When Kennedy was informed, Maxwell Taylor remembered that he "rushed from the room with a look of shock and dismay on his face." Kennedy had not anticipated Diệm's murder. The U.S. ambassador to South Vietnam, Henry Cabot Lodge, invited the coup leaders to the embassy and congratulated them. Ambassador Lodge informed Kennedy that "the prospects now are for a shorter war". Kennedy wrote Lodge a letter congratulating him for "a fine job".

Following the coup, chaos ensued. Hanoi took advantage of the situation and increased its support for the guerrillas. South Vietnam entered a period of extreme political instability, as one military government toppled another in quick succession. Increasingly, each new regime was viewed by the communists as a puppet of the Americans; whatever the failings of Diệm, his credentials as a nationalist (as Robert McNamara later reflected) had been impeccable.

U.S. military advisors were embedded at every level of the South Vietnamese armed forces. They were however criticized for ignoring the political nature of the insurgency. The Kennedy administration sought to refocus U.S. efforts on pacification- which in this case was defined as countering the growing threat of insurgency- and "winning over the hearts and minds" of the population. The military leadership in Washington, however, was hostile to any role for U.S. advisors other than conventional troop training. General Paul Harkins, the commander of U.S. forces in South Vietnam, confidently predicted victory by Christmas 1963. The CIA was less optimistic, however, warning that "the Viet Cong by and large retain de facto control of much of the countryside and have steadily increased the overall intensity of the effort".

Paramilitary officers from the CIA's Special Activities Division trained and led Hmong tribesmen in Laos and into Vietnam. The indigenous forces numbered in the tens of thousands and they conducted direct action missions, led by paramilitary officers, against the Communist Pathet Lao forces and their North Vietnamese supporters. The CIA also ran the Phoenix Program and participated in Military Assistance Command, Vietnam – Studies and Observations Group (MAC-V SOG), which was originally named the Special Operations Group, but was changed for cover purposes.

Gulf of Tonkin and Johnson's escalation, 1963–1969

President Kennedy was assassinated on 22 November 1963. Vice President Lyndon B. Johnson had not been heavily involved with policy toward Vietnam; however, upon becoming president, Johnson immediately focused on the war. On 24 November 1963, he said, "the battle against communism… must be joined… with strength and determination." Johnson knew he had inherited a rapidly deteriorating situation in South Vietnam, but he adhered to the widely accepted domino theory argument for defending the South: Should they retreat or appease, either action would imperil other nations beyond the conflict. Some have argued that the policy of North Vietnam was not to topple other non-communist governments in South East Asia.

The military revolutionary council, meeting in lieu of a strong South Vietnamese leader, was made up of 12 members. This council was headed by General Dương Văn Minh, whom Stanley Karnow, a journalist on the ground, later recalled as "a model of lethargy". Lodge, frustrated by the end of the year, cabled home about Minh: "Will he be strong enough to get on top of things?" Minh's regime was overthrown in January 1964 by General Nguyễn Khánh. There was also persistent instability in the military, however, as several coups—not all successful—occurred in a short period of time.

Gulf of Tonkin incident

On 2 August 1964, on an intelligence mission along North Vietnam's coast, allegedly fired upon and damaged several torpedo boats that had been stalking it in the Gulf of Tonkin. The circumstances of the attacks were murky. Lyndon Johnson commented to Undersecretary of State George Ball that "those sailors out there may have been shooting at flying fish."

An undated NSA publication declassified in 2005 revealed that there was no attack on 4 August.

The second "attack" led to retaliatory airstrikes, and prompted Congress to approve the Gulf of Tonkin Resolution on 7 August 1964. The resolution granted the president power "to take all necessary measures to repel any armed attack against the forces of the United States and to prevent further aggression" and Johnson would rely on this as giving him authority to expand the war. In the same month, Johnson pledged that he was not "committing American boys to fighting a war that I think ought to be fought by the boys of Asia to help protect their own land".

The National Security Council recommended a three-stage escalation of the bombing of North Vietnam. Following an attack on a U.S. Army base in Pleiku on 7 February 1965, a series of airstrikes was initiated, Operation Flaming Dart, while Soviet Premier Alexei Kosygin was on a state visit to North Vietnam. Operation Rolling Thunder and Operation Arc Light expanded aerial bombardment and ground support operations. The bombing campaign, which ultimately lasted three years, was intended to force North Vietnam to cease its support for the Viet Cong by threatening to destroy North Vietnamese air defenses and industrial infrastructure. It was additionally aimed at bolstering the morale of the South Vietnamese. Between March 1965 and November 1968, Rolling Thunder deluged the north with a million tons of missiles, rockets and bombs.

Bombing of Laos

Bombing was not restricted to North Vietnam. Other aerial campaigns, such as Operation Barrel Roll, targeted different parts of the Viet Cong and PAVN infrastructure. These included the Ho Chi Minh trail supply route, which ran through Laos and Cambodia. The ostensibly neutral Laos had become the scene of a civil war, pitting the Laotian government backed by the US against the Pathet Lao and its North Vietnamese allies.

Massive aerial bombardment against the Pathet Lao and PAVN forces were carried out by the US to prevent the collapse of the Royal central government, and to deny the use of the Ho Chi Minh Trail. Between 1964 and 1973, the U.S. dropped two million tons of bombs on Laos, nearly equal to the 2.1 million tons of bombs the U.S. dropped on Europe and Asia during all of World War II, making Laos the most heavily bombed country in history relative to the size of its population.

The objective of stopping North Vietnam and the Viet Cong was never reached. The Chief of Staff of the United States Air Force Curtis LeMay, however, had long advocated saturation bombing in Vietnam and wrote of the communists that "we're going to bomb them back into the Stone Age".

The 1964 offensive

Following the Gulf of Tonkin Resolution, Hanoi anticipated the arrival of US troops and began expanding the Viet Cong, as well as sending increasing numbers of North Vietnamese personnel southwards. At this phase they were outfitting the Viet Cong forces and standardising their equipment with AK-47 rifles and other supplies, as well as forming the 9th Division. "From a strength of approximately 5,000 at the start of 1959 the Viet Cong's ranks grew to about 100,000 at the end of 1964... Between 1961 and 1964 the Army's strength rose from about 850,000 to nearly a million men." The numbers for U.S. troops deployed to Vietnam during the same period were much lower: 2,000 in 1961, rising rapidly to 16,500 in 1964. During this phase, the use of captured equipment decreased, while greater numbers of ammunition and supplies were required to maintain regular units. Group 559 was tasked with expanding the Ho Chi Minh trail, in light of the near constant bombardment by US warplanes. The war had begun to shift into the final, conventional warfare phase of Hanoi's three-stage protracted warfare model. The Viet Cong was now tasked with destroying the ARVN and capturing and holding areas; however, the Viet Cong was not yet strong enough to assault major towns and cities.

In December 1964, ARVN forces had suffered heavy losses at the Battle of Bình Giã, in a battle that both sides viewed as a watershed. Previously, the VC had utilised hit-and-run guerrilla tactics. At Binh Gia, however, they had defeated a strong ARVN force in a conventional battle and remained in the field for four days. Tellingly, South Vietnamese forces were again defeated in June 1965 at the Battle of Đồng Xoài.

American ground war

On 8 March 1965, 3,500 U.S. Marines were landed near Da Nang, South Vietnam. This marked the beginning of the American ground war. U.S. public opinion overwhelmingly supported the deployment. The Marines' initial assignment was the defense of Da Nang Air Base. The first deployment of 3,500 in March 1965 was increased to nearly 200,000 by December. The U.S. military had long been schooled in offensive warfare. Regardless of political policies, U.S. commanders were institutionally and psychologically unsuited to a defensive mission.

General William Westmoreland informed Admiral U. S. Grant Sharp Jr., commander of U.S. Pacific forces, that the situation was critical. He said, "I am convinced that U.S. troops with their energy, mobility, and firepower can successfully take the fight to the NLF (Viet Cong)". With this recommendation, Westmoreland was advocating an aggressive departure from America's defensive posture and the sidelining of the South Vietnamese. By ignoring ARVN units, the U.S. commitment became open-ended. Westmoreland outlined a three-point plan to win the war:
 Phase 1. Commitment of U.S. (and other free world) forces necessary to halt the losing trend by the end of 1965.
 Phase 2. U.S. and allied forces mount major offensive actions to seize the initiative to destroy guerrilla and organized enemy forces. This phase would end when the enemy had been worn down, thrown on the defensive, and driven back from major populated areas.
 Phase 3. If the enemy persisted, a period of twelve to eighteen months following Phase 2 would be required for the final destruction of enemy forces remaining in remote base areas.

The plan was approved by Johnson and marked a profound departure from the previous administration's insistence that the government of South Vietnam was responsible for defeating the guerrillas. Westmoreland predicted victory by the end of 1967. Johnson did not, however, communicate this change in strategy to the media. Instead he emphasized continuity. The change in U.S. policy depended on matching the North Vietnamese and the Viet Cong in a contest of attrition and morale. The opponents were locked in a cycle of escalation. The idea that the government of South Vietnam could manage its own affairs was shelved. Westmoreland and McNamara furthermore touted the body count system for gauging victory, a metric that would later prove to be flawed.

The American buildup transformed the South Vietnamese economy and had a profound effect on society. South Vietnam was inundated with manufactured goods. Stanley Karnow noted that "the main PX [Post Exchange], located in the Saigon suburb of Cholon, was only slightly smaller than the New York Bloomingdale's..."

Washington encouraged its SEATO allies to contribute troops. Australia, New Zealand, Thailand and the Philippines all agreed to send troops. South Korea would later ask to join the Many Flags program in return for economic compensation. Major allies, however, notably NATO nations Canada and the United Kingdom, declined Washington's troop requests.

The U.S. and its allies mounted complex search and destroy operations, designed to find enemy forces, destroy them, and then withdraw, typically using war helicopters. In November 1965, the U.S. engaged in its first major battle with the PAVN, the Battle of Ia Drang. The operation was the first large scale helicopter air assault by the U.S., and first to employ Boeing B-52 Stratofortress strategic bombers in a tactical support role. These tactics continued in 1966–1967 with operations such as Masher, Thayer, Attleboro, Cedar Falls and Junction City. However, the PAVN/VC insurgents remained elusive and demonstrated great tactical flexibility. By 1967, the war had generated large-scale internal refugees, numbering nearly 2.1 million in South Vietnam, with 125,000 people evacuated and rendered homeless during Operation Masher alone, which was the largest search and destroy operation in the war up to that point. Operation Masher would have negligible impact, however, as the PAVN/VC returned to the province just four months after the operation ended. Despite the continual conductance of major operations, which the Viet Cong and PAVN would typically evade, the war was characterised by smaller-unit contacts or engagements. Up to the war's end, the Viet Cong and PAVN would initiate 90% of large firefights, of which 80% were clear and well-planned operations, and thus the PAVN/Viet Cong would retain strategic initiative despite overwhelming US force and fire-power deployment. The PAVN/Viet Cong had furthermore developed strategies capable of countering U.S. military doctrines and tactics (see NLF and PAVN battle tactics).

Meanwhile, the political situation in South Vietnam began to stabilise with the coming to power of prime minister Air Marshal Nguyễn Cao Kỳ and figurehead chief of state, General Nguyễn Văn Thiệu, in mid-1965 at the head of a military junta. This ended a series of coups that had happened more than once a year. In 1967, Thieu became president with Ky as his deputy, after rigged elections. Although they were nominally a civilian government, Ky was supposed to maintain real power through a behind-the-scenes military body. However, Thieu outmanoeuvred and sidelined Ky by filling the ranks with generals from his faction. Thieu was also accused of murdering Ky loyalists through contrived military accidents. Thieu, mistrustful and indecisive, remained president until 1975, having won a one-candidate election in 1971.

The Johnson administration employed a "policy of minimum candor" in its dealings with the media. Military information officers sought to manage media coverage by emphasizing stories that portrayed progress in the war. Over time, this policy damaged the public trust in official pronouncements. As the media's coverage of the war and that of the Pentagon diverged, a so-called credibility gap developed. Despite Johnson and Westmoreland publicly proclaiming victory and Westmoreland stating that the "end is coming into view", internal reports in the Pentagon Papers indicate that Viet Cong forces retained strategic initiative and controlled their losses. Viet Cong attacks against static US positions accounted for 30% of all engagements, VC/PAVN ambushes and encirclements for 23%, American ambushes against Viet Cong/PAVN forces for 9%, and American forces attacking Viet Cong emplacements for only 5% of all engagements.

Tet Offensive

In late 1967, the PAVN lured American forces into the hinterlands at Đắk Tô and at the Marine Khe Sanh combat base in Quảng Trị Province, where the U.S. fought a series of battles known as The Hill Fights. These actions were part of a diversionary strategy meant to draw U.S. forces towards the Central Highlands. Preparations were underway for the General Offensive, General Uprising, known as Tet Mau Than, or the Tet Offensive, with the intention of Văn Tiến Dũng for forces to launch "direct attacks on the American and puppet nerve centers—Saigon, Huế, Danang, all the cities, towns and main bases..." Le Duan sought to placate critics of the ongoing stalemate by planning a decisive victory. He reasoned that this could be achieved through sparking a general uprising within the towns and cities, along with mass defections among ARVN units, who were on holiday leave during the truce period.

The Tet Offensive began on 30 January 1968, as over 100 cities were attacked by over 85,000 VC/PAVN troops, including assaults on key military installations, headquarters, and government buildings and offices, including the U.S. Embassy in Saigon. U.S. and South Vietnamese forces were initially shocked by the scale, intensity and deliberative planning of the urban offensive, as infiltration of personnel and weapons into the cities was accomplished covertly; the offensive constituted an intelligence failure on the scale of Pearl Harbor. Most cities were recaptured within weeks, except the former imperial capital of Huế in which PAVN/Viet Cong troops captured most of the city and citadel except the headquarters of the 1st Division and held on in the fighting for 26 days. During that time, they had executed approximately 2,800 unarmed Huế civilians and foreigners they considered to be enemy's spies. In the following Battle of Huế American forces employed massive firepower that left 80 percent of the city in ruins. Further north, at Quảng Trị City, the ARVN Airborne Division, the 1st Division and a regiment of the US 1st Cavalry Division had managed to hold out and overcome an assault intended to capture the city. In Saigon, Viet Cong/PAVN fighters had captured areas in and around the city, attacking key installations and the neighbourhood of Cholon before US and ARVN forces dislodged them after three weeks. During one battle, Peter Arnett reported an infantry commander saying of the Battle of Bến Tre (laid to rubble by U.S. attacks) that "it became necessary to destroy the village in order to save it."

During the first month of the offensive, 1,100 Americans and other allied troops, 2,100 ARVN and 14,000 civilians were killed. By the end of the first offensive, after two months, nearly 5,000 ARVN and over 4,000 U.S. forces had been killed and 45,820 wounded. The U.S. claimed 17,000 of the PAVN and Viet Cong had been killed and 15,000 wounded. A month later a second offensive known as the May Offensive was launched; although less widespread, it demonstrated the Viet Cong were still capable of carrying out orchestrated nationwide offensives. Two months later a third offensive was launched, the Phase III Offensive. The PAVN's own official records of their losses across all three offensives was 45,267 killed and 111,179 total casualties. By then it had become the bloodiest year of the war up to that point. The failure to spark a general uprising and the lack of defections among the ARVN units meant both war goals of Hanoi had fallen flat at enormous costs. By the end of 1968, the VC insurgents held almost no territory in South Vietnam, and their recruitment dropped by over 80%, signifying a drastic reduction in guerrilla operations, necessitating increased use of PAVN regular soldiers from the north.

Prior to Tet, in November 1967, Westmoreland had spearheaded a public relations drive for the Johnson administration to bolster flagging public support. In a speech before the National Press Club he said a point in the war had been reached "where the end comes into view." Thus, the public was shocked and confused when Westmoreland's predictions were trumped by the Tet Offensive. Public approval of his overall performance dropped from 48 percent to 36 percent, and endorsement for the war effort fell from 40 percent to 26 percent." The American public and media began to turn against Johnson as the three offensives contradicted claims of progress made by the Johnson administration and the military.

At one point in 1968, Westmoreland considered the use of nuclear weapons in Vietnam in a contingency plan codenamed Fracture Jaw, which was abandoned when it became known to the White House. Westmoreland requested 200,000 additional troops, which was leaked to the media, and the subsequent fallout combined with intelligence failures caused him to be removed from command in March 1968, succeeded by his deputy Creighton Abrams.

On 10 May 1968, peace talks began between the United States and North Vietnam in Paris. Negotiations stagnated for five months, until Johnson gave orders to halt the bombing of North Vietnam. At the same time, Hanoi realized it could not achieve a "total victory" and employed a strategy known as "talking while fighting, fighting while talking", in which military offensives would occur concurrently with negotiations.

Johnson declined to run for re-election as his approval rating slumped from 48 to 36 percent. His escalation of the war in Vietnam divided Americans into warring camps, cost 30,000 American lives by that point and was regarded to have destroyed his presidency. Refusal to send more U.S. troops to Vietnam was also seen as Johnson's admission that the war was lost. As Secretary of Defense Robert McNamara noted, "the dangerous illusion of victory by the United States was therefore dead."

Vietnam was a major political issue during the United States presidential election in 1968. The election was won by Republican party candidate Richard Nixon who claimed to have a secret plan to end the war.

Vietnamization, 1969–1972

Nuclear threats and diplomacy
U.S. president Richard Nixon began troop withdrawals in 1969. His plan to build up the ARVN so that it could take over the defense of South Vietnam became known as "Vietnamization". As the PAVN/VC recovered from their 1968 losses and generally avoided contact, Creighton Abrams conducted operations aimed at disrupting logistics, with better use of firepower and more cooperation with the ARVN. On 27 October 1969, Nixon had ordered a squadron of 18 B-52s loaded with nuclear weapons to race to the border of Soviet airspace to convince the Soviet Union, in accord with the madman theory, that he was capable of anything to end the Vietnam War. Nixon had also sought détente with the Soviet Union and rapprochement with China, which decreased global tensions and led to nuclear arms reduction by both superpowers; however, the Soviets continued to supply the North Vietnamese with aid.

Hanoi's war strategy

In September 1969, Ho Chi Minh died, aged seventy-nine. The failure of Tet in sparking a popular uprising caused a shift in Hanoi's war strategy, and the Giáp-Chinh "Northern-First" faction regained control over military affairs from the Lê Duẩn-Hoàng Văn Thái "Southern-First" faction. An unconventional victory was sidelined in favor of a strategy built on conventional victory through conquest. Large-scale offensives were rolled back in favour of small-unit and sapper attacks as well as targeting the pacification and Vietnamization strategy. In the two-year period following Tet, the PAVN had begun its transformation from a fine light-infantry, limited mobility force into a high-mobile and mechanised combined arms force. By 1970, over 70% of communist troops in the south were northerners, and southern-dominated VC units no longer existed.

U.S. domestic controversies
The anti-war movement was gaining strength in the United States. Nixon appealed to the "silent majority" of Americans who he said supported the war without showing it in public. But revelations of the 1968 My Lai Massacre, in which a U.S. Army unit raped and killed civilians, and the 1969 "Green Beret Affair", where eight Special Forces soldiers, including the 5th Special Forces Group Commander, were arrested for the murder of a suspected double agent, provoked national and international outrage.

In 1971, the Pentagon Papers were leaked to The New York Times. The top-secret history of U.S. involvement in Vietnam, commissioned by the Department of Defense, detailed a long series of public deceptions on the part of the U.S. government. The Supreme Court ruled that its publication was legal.

Collapsing U.S. morale

Following the Tet Offensive and the decreasing support among the U.S. public for the war, U.S. forces began a period of morale collapse, disillusionment and disobedience. At home, desertion rates quadrupled from 1966 levels. Among the enlisted, only 2.5% chose infantry combat positions in 1969–1970. ROTC enrollment decreased from 191,749 in 1966 to 72,459 by 1971, and reached an all-time low of 33,220 in 1974, depriving U.S. forces of much-needed military leadership.

Open refusal to engage in patrols or carry out orders and disobedience began to emerge during this period, with one notable case of an entire company refusing orders to engage or carry out operations. Unit cohesion began to dissipate and focused on minimising contact with Viet Cong and PAVN. A practice known as "sand-bagging" started occurring, where units ordered to go on patrol would go into the country-side, find a site out of view from superiors and rest while radioing in false coordinates and unit reports. Drug usage increased rapidly among U.S. forces during this period, as 30% of U.S. troops regularly used marijuana, while a House subcommittee found 10–15% of U.S. troops in Vietnam regularly used high-grade heroin. From 1969 on, search-and-destroy operations became referred to as "search and evade" or "search and avoid" operations, falsifying battle reports while avoiding guerrilla fighters. A total of 900 fragging and suspected fragging incidents were investigated, most occurring between 1969 and 1971. In 1969, field-performance of the U.S. Forces was characterised by lowered morale, lack of motivation, and poor leadership. The significant decline in U.S. morale was demonstrated by the Battle of FSB Mary Ann in March 1971, in which a sapper attack inflicted serious losses on the U.S. defenders. William Westmoreland, no longer in command but tasked with investigation of the failure, cited a clear dereliction of duty, lax defensive postures and lack of officers in charge as its cause.

On the collapse of U.S. morale, historian Shelby Stanton wrote:

ARVN taking the lead and U.S. ground-force withdrawal

Beginning in 1970, American troops were withdrawn from border areas where most of the fighting took place and instead redeployed along the coast and interior. US casualties in 1970 were less than half of 1969 casualties after being relegated to less active combat. While U.S. forces were redeployed, the ARVN took over combat operations throughout the country, with casualties double US casualties in 1969, and more than triple US ones in 1970. In the post-Tet environment, membership in the South Vietnamese Regional Force and Popular Force militias grew, and they were now more capable of providing village security, which the Americans had not accomplished under Westmoreland.

In 1970, Nixon announced the withdrawal of an additional 150,000 American troops, reducing the number of Americans to 265,500. By 1970, Viet Cong forces were no longer southern-majority, as nearly 70% of units were northerners. Between 1969 and 1971 the Viet Cong and some PAVN units had reverted to small unit tactics typical of 1967 and prior instead of nationwide grand offensives. In 1971, Australia and New Zealand withdrew their soldiers and U.S. troop count was further reduced to 196,700, with a deadline to remove another 45,000 troops by February 1972. The United States also reduced support troops, and in March 1971 the 5th Special Forces Group, the first American unit deployed to South Vietnam, withdrew to Fort Bragg, North Carolina.

Cambodia

Prince Norodom Sihanouk had proclaimed Cambodia neutral since 1955, but permitted the PAVN/Viet Cong to use the port of Sihanoukville and the Sihanouk Trail. In March 1969 Nixon launched a massive secret bombing campaign, called Operation Menu, against communist sanctuaries along the Cambodia/Vietnam border. Only five high-ranking congressional officials were informed of Operation Menu.

In March 1970, Prince Sihanouk was deposed by his pro-American prime minister Lon Nol, who demanded that North Vietnamese troops leave Cambodia or face military action. Lon Nol began rounding up Vietnamese civilians in Cambodia into internment camps and massacring them, provoking harsh reactions from both the North Vietnamese and South Vietnamese governments. In April–May 1970, North Vietnam invaded Cambodia at the request of the Khmer Rouge following negotiations with deputy leader Nuon Chea. Nguyen Co Thach recalls: "Nuon Chea has asked for help and we have liberated five provinces of Cambodia in ten days." U.S. and ARVN forces launched the Cambodian Campaign in May to attack PAVN and Viet Cong bases. A counter-offensive in 1971 as part of Operation Chenla II by the PAVN would recapture most of the border areas and decimate most of Lon Nol's forces.

The U.S. incursion into Cambodia sparked nationwide U.S. protests as Nixon had promised to deescalate the American involvement. Four students were killed by National Guardsmen in May 1970 during a protest at Kent State University in Ohio, which provoked further public outrage in the United States. The reaction to the incident by the Nixon administration was seen as callous and indifferent, reinvigorating the declining anti-war movement. The U.S. Air Force continued to heavily bomb Cambodia in support of the Cambodian government as part of Operation Freedom Deal.

Laos

Building up on the success of ARVN units in Cambodia, and further testing the Vietnamization program, the ARVN were tasked to launch Operation Lam Son 719 in February 1971, the first major ground operation aimed directly at attacking the Ho Chi Minh trail by attacking the major crossroad of Tchepone. This offensive would also be the first time the PAVN would field-test its combined arms force. The first few days were considered a success but the momentum had slowed after fierce resistance. Thiệu had halted the general advance, leaving armoured divisions able to surround them. Thieu had ordered air assault troops to capture Tchepone and withdraw, despite facing four-times larger numbers. During the withdrawal the PAVN counterattack had forced a panicked rout. Half of the ARVN troops involved were either captured or killed, half of the ARVN/US support helicopters were downed by anti-aircraft fire and the operation was considered a fiasco, demonstrating operational deficiencies still present within the ARVN. Nixon and Thieu had sought to use this event to show-case victory simply by capturing Tchepone, and it was spun off as an "operational success".

Easter Offensive and Paris Peace Accords, 1972
Vietnamization was again tested by the Easter Offensive of 1972, a massive conventional PAVN invasion of South Vietnam. The PAVN quickly overran the northern provinces and in coordination with other forces attacked from Cambodia, threatening to cut the country in half. U.S. troop withdrawals continued, but American airpower responded, beginning Operation Linebacker, and the offensive was halted.

The war was central to the 1972 U.S. presidential election as Nixon's opponent, George McGovern, campaigned on immediate withdrawal. Nixon's National Security Advisor, Henry Kissinger, had continued secret negotiations with North Vietnam's Lê Đức Thọ and in October 1972 reached an agreement. President Thieu demanded changes to the peace accord upon its discovery, and when North Vietnam went public with the agreement's details, the Nixon administration claimed they were attempting to embarrass the president. The negotiations became deadlocked when Hanoi demanded new changes. To show his support for South Vietnam and force Hanoi back to the negotiating table, Nixon ordered Operation Linebacker II, a massive bombing of Hanoi and Haiphong 18–29 December 1972. Nixon pressured Thieu to accept the terms of the agreement or else face retaliatory military action from the U.S.

On 15 January 1973, all U.S. combat activities were suspended. Lê Đức Thọ and Henry Kissinger, along with the PRG Foreign Minister Nguyễn Thị Bình and a reluctant President Thiệu, signed the Paris Peace Accords on 27 January 1973. This officially ended direct U.S. involvement in the Vietnam War, created a ceasefire between North Vietnam/PRG and South Vietnam, guaranteed the territorial integrity of Vietnam under the Geneva Conference of 1954, called for elections or a political settlement between the PRG and South Vietnam, allowed 200,000 communist troops to remain in the south, and agreed to a POW exchange. There was a sixty-day period for the total withdrawal of U.S. forces. "This article", noted Peter Church, "proved... to be the only one of the Paris Agreements which was fully carried out." All U.S. forces personnel were completely withdrawn by March 1973.

U.S. exit and final campaigns, 1973–1975

In the lead-up to the ceasefire on 28 January, both sides attempted to maximize the land and population under their control in a campaign known as the War of the flags. Fighting continued after the ceasefire, this time without US participation, and continued throughout the year. North Vietnam was allowed to continue supplying troops in the South but only to the extent of replacing expended material. Later that year the Nobel Peace Prize was awarded to Kissinger and Thọ, but the North Vietnamese negotiator declined it saying that true peace did not yet exist.

On 15 March 1973, Nixon implied the US would intervene again militarily if the North launched a full offensive, and Secretary of Defense James Schlesinger re-affirmed this position during his June 1973 confirmation hearings. Public and congressional reaction to Nixon's statement was unfavorable, prompting the U.S. Senate to pass the Case–Church Amendment to prohibit any intervention.

PAVN/VC leaders expected the ceasefire terms would favor their side, but Saigon, bolstered by a surge of U.S. aid received just before the ceasefire went into effect, began to roll back the Viet Cong. The PAVN/VC responded with a new strategy hammered out in a series of meetings in Hanoi in March 1973, according to the memoirs of Trần Văn Trà. With U.S. bombings suspended, work on the Ho Chi Minh trail and other logistical structures could proceed unimpeded. Logistics would be upgraded until the North was in a position to launch a massive invasion of the South, projected for the 1975–1976 dry season. Tra calculated that this date would be Hanoi's last opportunity to strike before Saigon's army could be fully trained. The PAVN/VC resumed offensive operations when the dry season began in 1973, and by January 1974 had recaptured territory it lost during the previous dry season.

Within South Vietnam, the departure of the US military and the global recession that followed the 1973 oil crisis hurt an economy that was partly dependent on U.S. financial support and troop presence. After two clashes that left 55 ARVN soldiers dead, President Thieu announced on 4 January 1974, that the war had restarted and that the Paris Peace Accords were no longer in effect. There were over 25,000 South Vietnamese casualties during the ceasefire period. Gerald Ford took over as U.S. president on 9 August 1974 after the resignation of President Nixon, and Congress cut financial aid to South Vietnam from $1 billion a year to $700 million. Congress also voted in further restrictions on funding to be phased in through 1975 and to culminate in a total cutoff in 1976.

The success of the 1973–1974 dry season offensive inspired Trà to return to Hanoi in October 1974 and plead for a larger offensive the next dry season. This time, Trà could travel on a drivable highway with regular fueling stops, a vast change from the days when the Ho Chi Minh trail was a dangerous mountain trek. Giáp, the North Vietnamese defence minister, was reluctant to approve of Trà's plan since a larger offensive might provoke U.S. reaction and interfere with the big push planned for 1976. Trà appealed to Giáp's superior, first secretary Lê Duẩn, who approved the operation. Trà's plan called for a limited offensive from Cambodia into Phước Long Province. The strike was designed to solve local logistical problems, gauge the reaction of South Vietnamese forces, and determine whether the U.S. would return.

On 13 December 1974, North Vietnamese forces attacked Phước Long. Phuoc Binh, the provincial capital, fell on 6 January 1975. Ford desperately asked Congress for funds to assist and re-supply the South before it was overrun. Congress refused. The fall of Phuoc Binh and the lack of an American response left the South Vietnamese elite demoralized.

The speed of this success led the Politburo to reassess its strategy. It decided that operations in the Central Highlands would be turned over to General Văn Tiến Dũng and that Pleiku should be seized, if possible. Before he left for the South, Dũng was addressed by Lê Duẩn: "Never have we had military and political conditions so perfect or a strategic advantage as great as we have now."

At the start of 1975, the South Vietnamese had three times as much artillery and twice the number of tanks and armoured cars as the PAVN. They also had 1,400 aircraft and a two-to-one numerical superiority in combat troops over the PAVN/VC. However, heightened oil prices meant that many of these assets could not be adequately leveraged. Moreover, the rushed nature of Vietnamization, intended to cover the US retreat, resulted in a lack of spare parts, ground-crew, and maintenance personnel, which rendered most of the equipment inoperable.

Campaign 275

On 10 March 1975, General Dung launched Campaign 275, a limited offensive into the Central Highlands, supported by tanks and heavy artillery. The target was Buôn Ma Thuột, in Đắk Lắk Province. If the town could be taken, the provincial capital of Pleiku and the road to the coast would be exposed for a planned campaign in 1976. The ARVN proved incapable of resisting the onslaught, and its forces collapsed on 11 March. Once again, Hanoi was surprised by the speed of their success. Dung now urged the Politburo to allow him to seize Pleiku immediately and then turn his attention to Kon Tum. He argued that with two months of good weather remaining until the onset of the monsoon, it would be irresponsible to not take advantage of the situation.

President Thiệu, a former general, was fearful that his forces would be cut off in the north by the attacking communists; Thieu ordered a retreat, which soon turned into a bloody rout. While the bulk of ARVN forces attempted to flee, isolated units fought desperately. ARVN general Phu abandoned Pleiku and Kon Tum and retreated toward the coast, in what became known as the "column of tears".

On 20 March, Thieu reversed himself and ordered Huế, Vietnam's third-largest city, be held at all costs, and then changed his policy several times. As the PAVN launched their attack, panic set in, and ARVN resistance withered. On 22 March, the PAVN opened the siege of Huế. Civilians flooded the airport and the docks hoping for any mode of escape. As resistance in Huế collapsed, PAVN rockets rained down on Da Nang and its airport. By 28 March 35,000 PAVN troops were poised to attack the suburbs. By 30 March 100,000 leaderless ARVN troops surrendered as the PAVN marched victoriously through Da Nang. With the fall of the city, the defense of the Central Highlands and Northern provinces came to an end.

Final North Vietnamese offensive

With the northern half of the country under their control, the Politburo ordered General Dung to launch the final offensive against Saigon. The operational plan for the Ho Chi Minh Campaign called for the capture of Saigon before 1 May. Hanoi wished to avoid the coming monsoon and prevent any redeployment of ARVN forces defending the capital. Northern forces, their morale boosted by their recent victories, rolled on, taking Nha Trang, Cam Ranh and Da Lat.

For two bloody weeks, severe fighting raged as the ARVN defenders made a last stand to try to block the PAVN advance. On 21 April, however, the exhausted garrison was ordered to withdraw towards Saigon. An embittered and tearful president Thieu resigned on the same day, declaring that the United States had betrayed South Vietnam. In a scathing attack, he suggested that Kissinger had tricked him into signing the Paris peace agreement two years earlier, promising military aid that failed to materialize. Having transferred power to Trần Văn Hương on 21 April, he left for Taiwan on 25 April. After having appealed unsuccessfully to Congress for $722 million in emergency aid for South Vietnam, President Ford had given a televised speech on 23 April, declaring an end to the Vietnam War and all U.S. aid.

By the end of April, the ARVN had collapsed on all fronts except in the Mekong Delta. Thousands of refugees streamed southward, ahead of the main communist onslaught. On 27 April, 100,000 PAVN troops encircled Saigon. The city was defended by about 30,000 ARVN troops. To hasten a collapse and foment panic, the PAVN shelled Tan Son Nhut Airport and forced its closure. With the air exit closed, large numbers of civilians found that they had no way out.

Fall of Saigon

Chaos, unrest, and panic broke out as hysterical South Vietnamese officials and civilians scrambled to leave Saigon. Martial law was declared. American helicopters began evacuating South Vietnamese, U.S. and foreign nationals from various parts of the city and from the U.S. embassy compound. Operation Frequent Wind had been delayed until the last possible moment, because of U.S. Ambassador Graham Martin's belief that Saigon could be held and that a political settlement could be reached. Frequent Wind was the largest helicopter evacuation in history. It began on 29 April, in an atmosphere of desperation, as hysterical crowds of Vietnamese vied for limited space. Frequent Wind continued around the clock, as PAVN tanks breached defenses near Saigon. In the early morning hours of 30 April, the last U.S. Marines evacuated the embassy by helicopter, as civilians swamped the perimeter and poured into the grounds.

On 30 April 1975, PAVN troops entered the city of Saigon and quickly overcame all resistance, capturing key buildings and installations. Two tanks from the 203rd Tank Brigade of the 2nd Corps crashed through the gates of the Independence Palace and the Viet Cong flag was raised above it at 11:30 am local time. President Dương Văn Minh, who had succeeded Huong two days earlier, surrendered to Lieutenant colonel Bùi Văn Tùng, the political commissar of the 203rd Tank Brigade. Minh was then escorted to Radio Saigon to announce the surrender declaration (spontaneously written by Tung). The statement was on air at 2:30 pm.

Opposition to U.S. involvement

During the course of the Vietnam War a large segment of the American population came to be opposed to U.S. involvement in Southeast Asia. In January 1967, only 32% of Americans thought the U.S. had made a mistake in sending troops to Vietnam. Public opinion steadily turned against the war following 1967 and by 1970 only a third of Americans believed that the U.S. had not made a mistake by sending troops to fight in Vietnam.

Early opposition to U.S. involvement in Vietnam drew its inspiration from the Geneva Conference of 1954. American support of Diệm in refusing elections was seen as thwarting the democracy America claimed to support. John F. Kennedy, while senator, opposed involvement in Vietnam. Nonetheless, it is possible to specify certain groups who led the anti-war movement at its peak in the late 1960s and the reasons why. Many young people protested because they were the ones being drafted, while others were against the war because the anti-war movement grew increasingly popular among the counterculture. Some advocates within the peace movement advocated a unilateral withdrawal of U.S. forces from Vietnam. Opposition to the Vietnam War tended to unite groups opposed to U.S. anti-communism and imperialism, and for those involved with the New Left, such as the Catholic Worker Movement. Others, such as Stephen Spiro, opposed the war based on the theory of Just War. Some wanted to show solidarity with the people of Vietnam, such as Norman Morrison emulating the self-immolation of Thích Quảng Đức.

High-profile opposition to the Vietnam War increasingly turned to mass protests in an effort to shift U.S. public opinion. Riots broke out at the 1968 Democratic National Convention during protests against the war. After news reports of American military abuses, such as the 1968 My Lai Massacre, brought new attention and support to the anti-war movement, some veterans joined Vietnam Veterans Against the War. On 15 October 1969, the Vietnam Moratorium attracted millions of Americans. The fatal shooting of four students at Kent State University in 1970 led to nationwide university protests. Anti-war protests declined after the signing of the Paris Peace Accords and the end of the draft in January 1973, and the withdrawal of American troops from Vietnam in the months following.

Involvement of other countries

Pro-Hanoi

China
The People's Republic of China provided significant support for North Vietnam when the U.S. started to intervene, included through financial aid and the deployment of hundreds of thousands of military personnel in support roles. China said that its military and economic aid to North Vietnam and the Viet Cong totaled $20 billion (approx. $160 billion adjusted for inflation in 2022) during the Vietnam War; included in that aid were donations of 5 million tons of food to North Vietnam (equivalent to North Vietnamese food production in a single year), accounting for 10–15% of the North Vietnamese food supply by the 1970s.

In the summer of 1962, Mao Zedong agreed to supply Hanoi with 90,000 rifles and guns free of charge, and starting in 1965, China began sending anti-aircraft units and engineering battalions to North Vietnam to repair the damage caused by American bombing. In particular, they helped man anti-aircraft batteries, rebuild roads and railroads, transport supplies, and perform other engineering works. This freed North Vietnamese army units for combat in the South. China sent 320,000 troops and annual arms shipments worth $180 million. The Chinese military claims to have caused 38% of American air losses in the war.

The PRC also began financing the Khmer Rouge as a counterweight to North Vietnam at this time. China "armed and trained" the Khmer Rouge during the civil war, and continued to aid them for years afterward.

Soviet Union

The Soviet Union supplied North Vietnam with medical supplies, arms, tanks, planes, helicopters, artillery, anti-aircraft missiles and other military equipment. Soviet crews fired Soviet-made surface-to-air missiles at U.S. aircraft in 1965. Over a dozen Soviet soldiers lost their lives in this conflict. Following the dissolution of the Soviet Union in 1991, Russian Federation officials acknowledged that the USSR had stationed up to 3,000 troops in Vietnam during the war.

According to Russian sources, between 1953 and 1991, the hardware donated by the Soviet Union included: 2,000 tanks; 1,700 APCs; 7,000 artillery guns; over 5,000 anti-aircraft guns; 158 surface-to-air missile launchers; and 120 helicopters. In total, the Soviets sent North Vietnam annual arms shipments worth $450 million. From July 1965 to the end of 1974, fighting in Vietnam was observed by some 6,500 officers and generals, as well as more than 4,500 soldiers and sergeants of the Soviet Armed Forces, amounting to roughly 11,000 military personnel. The KGB had also helped develop the signals intelligence capabilities of the North Vietnamese, through an operation known as Vostok (named after the Vostok 1).

Pro-Saigon

As South Vietnam was formally part of a military alliance with the US, Australia, New Zealand, France, the UK, Pakistan, Thailand and the Philippines, the alliance was invoked during the war. The UK, France and Pakistan declined to participate, and South Korea and Taiwan were non-treaty participants.

United Front for the Liberation of Oppressed Races (FULRO)

The ethnic minority peoples of South Vietnam, like the Montagnards (Degar) in the Central Highlands, the Hindu and Muslim Cham, and the Buddhist Khmer Krom, were actively recruited in the war. There was an active strategy of recruitment and favorable treatment of Montagnard tribes for the Viet Cong, as they were pivotal for control of infiltration routes. Some groups had split off and formed the United Front for the Liberation of Oppressed Races (French: Front Uni de Lutte des Races Opprimées, acronym: FULRO) to fight for autonomy or independence. FULRO fought against both the South Vietnamese and the Viet Cong, later proceeding to fight against the unified Socialist Republic of Vietnam after the fall of South Vietnam.

During the war, the South Vietnamese president Ngo Dinh Diem began a program to settle ethnic Vietnamese Kinh on Montagnard lands in the Central Highlands region. This provoked a backlash from the Montagnards, some joining the Viet Cong as a result. The Cambodians under both the pro-China King Sihanouk and the pro-American Lon Nol supported their fellow co-ethnic Khmer Krom in South Vietnam, following an anti-ethnic Vietnamese policy. Following Vietnamization many Montagnard groups and fighters were incorporated into the Vietnamese Rangers as border sentries.

War crimes

A large number of war crimes took place during the Vietnam War. War crimes were committed by both sides during the conflict and included rape, massacres of civilians, bombings of civilian targets, terrorism, the widespread use of torture, and the murder of prisoners of war. Additional common crimes included theft, arson, and the destruction of property not warranted by military necessity.

South Vietnamese, Korean and American

In 1968, the Vietnam War Crimes Working Group (VWCWG) was established by the Pentagon task force set up in the wake of the My Lai Massacre, to attempt to ascertain the veracity of emerging claims of war crimes by U.S. armed forces in Vietnam, during the Vietnam War period.

Of the war crimes reported to military authorities, sworn statements by witnesses and status reports indicated that 320 incidents had a factual basis. The substantiated cases included 7 massacres between 1967 and 1971 in which at least 137 civilians were killed; seventy eight further attacks targeting non-combatants resulting in at least 57 deaths, 56 wounded and 15 sexually assaulted; and 141 cases of U.S. soldiers torturing civilian detainees or prisoners of war with fists, sticks, bats, water or electric shock. Journalism in the ensuing years has documented other overlooked and uninvestigated war crimes involving every army division that was active in Vietnam, including the atrocities committed by Tiger Force. Rummel estimated that American forces committed around 5,500 democidal killings between 1960 and 1972, from a range of between 4,000 and 10,000 killed.

U.S. forces established numerous free-fire zones as a tactic to prevent Viet Cong fighters from sheltering in South Vietnamese villages. Such practice, which involved the assumption that any individual appearing in the designated zones was an enemy combatant that could be freely targeted by weapons, is regarded by journalist Lewis M. Simons as "a severe violation of the laws of war". Nick Turse, in his 2013 book, Kill Anything that Moves, argues that a relentless drive toward higher body counts, a widespread use of free-fire zones, rules of engagement where civilians who ran from soldiers or helicopters could be viewed as Viet Cong and a widespread disdain for Vietnamese civilians led to massive civilian casualties and endemic war crimes inflicted by U.S. troops. One example cited by Turse is Operation Speedy Express, an operation by the 9th Infantry Division, which was described by John Paul Vann as, in effect, "many Mỹ Lais". A report by Newsweek magazine suggested that at least 5,000 civilians may have been killed during six months of the operation, and there were approximately 748 recovered weapons and an official US military body count of 10,889 enemy combatants killed.

R.J. Rummel estimated that 39,000 were killed by South Vietnam during the Diem-era in democide from a range of between 16,000 and 167,000 people; for 1964 to 1975, Rummel estimated 50,000 people were killed in democide, from a range of between 42,000 and 128,000. Thus, the total for 1954 to 1975 is 81,000, from a range of between 57,000 and 284,000 deaths caused by South Vietnam. Benjamin Valentino estimates 110,000–310,000 deaths as a "possible case" of "counter-guerrilla mass killings" by U.S. and South Vietnamese forces during the war. The Phoenix Program, coordinated by the CIA and involving US and South Vietnamese security forces, was aimed at destroying the political infrastructure of the Viet Cong. The program killed 26,369 to 41,000 people, with an unknown number being innocent civilians.

Torture and ill-treatment were frequently applied by the South Vietnamese to POWs as well as civilian prisoners. During their visit to the Con Son Prison in 1970, U.S. congressmen Augustus F. Hawkins and William R. Anderson witnessed detainees either confined in minute "tiger cages" or chained to their cells, and provided with poor-quality food. A group of American doctors inspecting the prison in the same year found many inmates suffering symptoms resulting from forced immobility and torture. During their visits to transit detention facilities under American administration in 1968 and 1969, the International Red Cross recorded many cases of torture and inhumane treatment before the captives were handed over to South Vietnamese authorities. Torture was conducted by the South Vietnamese government in collusion with the CIA.

South Korean forces were also accused of war crimes. One documented event was the Phong Nhị and Phong Nhất massacre where the 2nd Marine Brigade reportedly killed between 69 and 79 civilians on 12 February 1968 in Phong Nhị and Phong Nhất village, Điện Bàn District, Quảng Nam Province. South Korean forces are also accused of perpetrating other massacres, namely: Bình Hòa massacre, Binh Tai Massacre and Hà My massacre.

North Vietnamese and Viet Cong

Ami Pedahzur has written that "the overall volume and lethality of Viet Cong terrorism rivals or exceeds all but a handful of terrorist campaigns waged over the last third of the twentieth century", based on the definition of terrorists as a non-state actor, and examining targeted killings and civilian deaths which are estimated at over 18,000 from 1966 to 1969. The US Department of Defense estimates the VC/PAVN had conducted 36,000 murders and almost 58,000 kidnappings from 1967 to 1972, c. 1973. Benjamin Valentino attributes 45,000–80,000 "terrorist mass killings" to the Viet Cong during the war. Statistics for 1968–1972 suggest that "about 80 percent of the terrorist victims were ordinary civilians and only about 20 percent were government officials, policemen, members of the self-defence forces or pacification cadres." Viet Cong tactics included the frequent mortaring of civilians in refugee camps, and the placing of mines on highways frequented by villagers taking their goods to urban markets. Some mines were set only to go off after heavy vehicle passage, causing extensive slaughter aboard packed civilian buses.

Notable Viet Cong atrocities include the massacre of over 3,000 unarmed civilians at Huế during the Tet Offensive and the killing of 252 civilians during the Đắk Sơn massacre. 155,000 refugees fleeing the final North Vietnamese Spring Offensive were reported to have been killed or abducted on the road to Tuy Hòa in 1975. According to Rummel, PAVN and Viet Cong troops killed 164,000 civilians in democide between 1954 and 1975 in South Vietnam, from a range of between 106,000 and 227,000 (50,000 of which were reportedly killed by shelling and mortar on ARVN forces during the retreat to Tuy Hoa). North Vietnam was also known for its abusive treatment of American POWs, most notably in Hỏa Lò Prison (aka the Hanoi Hilton), where torture was employed to extract confessions.

Women

American nurses

American women served on active duty performing a variety of jobs. Early in 1963, the Army Nurse Corps (ANC) launched Operation Nightingale, an intensive effort to recruit nurses to serve in Vietnam. First Lieutenant Sharon Lane was the only female military nurse to be killed by enemy gunfire during the war, on 8 June 1969. One civilian doctor, Eleanor Ardel Vietti, who was captured by Viet Cong on 30 May 1962, in Buôn Ma Thuột, remains the only American woman unaccounted for from the Vietnam War.

Although a small number of women were assigned to combat zones, they were never allowed directly in the field of battle. Unlike the men, the women who served in the military were solely volunteers. They faced a plethora of challenges, one of which was the relatively small number of female soldiers. Living in a male-dominated environment created tensions between the sexes. By 1973, approximately 7,500 women had served in Vietnam in the Southeast Asian theater. American women serving in Vietnam were subject to societal stereotypes. To address this problem, the ANC released advertisements portraying women in the ANC as "proper, professional and well protected." This effort to highlight the positive aspects of a nursing career reflected the feminism of the 1960s–1970s in the United States. Although female military nurses lived in a heavily male environment, very few cases of sexual harassment were ever reported.

Vietnamese soldiers

Unlike the American women who went to Vietnam, both South and North Vietnamese women were enlisted and served in combat zones. Women were enlisted in both the PAVN and the Viet Cong, many joining due to the promises of female equality and a greater social role within society. Some women also served for the PAVN and Viet Cong intelligence services. The deputy military commander of the Viet Cong, was a female general, Nguyễn Thị Định. All-female units were present throughout the entirety of the war, ranging from front-line combat troops to anti-aircraft, scout and reconnaissance units. Female combat squads were present in the Cu Chi theatre. They also fought in the Battle of Hue. In addition, large numbers of women served in North Vietnam, manning anti-aircraft batteries, providing village security and serving in logistics on the Ho Chi Minh trail. Other women were embedded with troops on the front-lines, serving as doctors and medical personnel. Đặng Thùy Trâm became renowned after her diary was published following her death. The Foreign Minister for the Viet Cong and later the PRG was also a woman, Nguyễn Thị Bình.

In South Vietnam, many women voluntarily served in the ARVN's Women's Armed Force Corps (WAFC) and various other Women's corps in the military. Some, like in the WAFC, served in combat with other soldiers. Others served as nurses and doctors in the battlefield and in military hospitals, or served in South Vietnam or America's intelligence agencies. During Diệm's presidency, his sister-in-law Madame Nhu was the commander of the WAFC. Many women joined provincial and voluntary village-level militia in the People's Self-Defense Force especially during the ARVN expansions later in the war.

During the war, more than one million rural people migrated or fled the fighting in the South Vietnamese countryside to the cities, especially Saigon. Among the internal refugees were many young women who became the ubiquitous "bar girls" of wartime South Vietnam, "hawking her wares—be that cigarettes, liquor, or herself" to American and allied soldiers. American bases were ringed by bars and brothels. 8,040 Vietnamese women came to the United States as war brides between 1964 and 1975. Many mixed-blood Amerasian children were left behind when their American fathers returned to the United States after their tour of duty in South Vietnam; 26,000 of them were permitted to immigrate to the United States in the 1980s and 1990s.

Journalists
Women also played a prominent role as front-line reporters in the conflict, directly reporting on the conflict as it occurred. A number of women volunteered on the North Vietnamese side as embedded journalists, including author Lê Minh Khuê embedded with PAVN forces, on the Ho Chi Minh trail as well as on combat fronts. A number of prominent Western journalists were also involved in covering the war, with Dickey Chapelle being among the first as well as the first American female reporter killed in a war. The French-speaking Australian journalist Kate Webb was captured along with a photographer and others by the Viet Cong in Cambodia and travelled into Laos with them; they were released back into Cambodia after 23 days of captivity. Webb would be the first Western journalist to be captured and released, as well as cover the perspective of the Viet Cong in her memoir On The Other Side. Another French-speaking journalist, Catherine Leroy, was briefly captured and released by North Vietnamese forces during the Battle of Huế, capturing some famous photos from the battles that would appear on the cover of Life Magazine.

Black servicemen

The experience of American military personnel of African ancestry during the Vietnam War had received significant attention. For example, the website "African-American Involvement in the Vietnam War" compiles examples of such coverage, as does the print and broadcast work of journalist Wallace Terry whose book Bloods: An Oral History of the Vietnam War by Black Veterans (1984), includes observations about the impact of the war on the black community in general and on black servicemen specifically. Points he makes on the latter topic include: the higher proportion of combat casualties in Vietnam among African American servicemen than among American soldiers of other races, the shift toward and different attitudes of black military volunteers and black conscripts, the discrimination encountered by black servicemen "on the battlefield in decorations, promotion and duty assignments" as well as their having to endure "the racial insults, cross-burnings and Confederate flags of their white comrades"—and the experiences faced by black soldiers stateside, during the war and after America's withdrawal.

Civil rights leaders protested the disproportionate casualties and the overrepresentation in hazardous duty and combat roles experienced by African American servicemen, prompting reforms that were implemented beginning in 1967–68. As a result, by the war's completion in 1975, black casualties had declined to 12.5% of US combat deaths, approximately equal to percentage of draft-eligible black men, though still slightly higher than the 10% who served in the military.

Weapons

During the early stages of the war, the Viet Cong mainly sustained itself with captured arms; these were often of American manufacture or were crude, makeshift weapons used alongside shotguns made of galvanized pipes. Most arms were captured from poorly defended ARVN militia outposts. In 1967, all Viet Cong battalions were reequipped with arms of Soviet design such as the AK-47 assault rifle, carbines and the RPG-2 anti-tank weapon. Their weapons were principally of Chinese or Soviet manufacture. In the period up to the conventional phase in 1970, the Viet Cong and PAVN were primarily limited to 81 mm mortars, recoilless rifles, and small arms and had significantly lighter equipment and firepower in comparison with the US arsenal. They relied on ambushes, superior stealth, planning, marksmanship, and small-unit tactics to face the disproportionate US technological advantage.

After the Tet Offensive, many PAVN units incorporated light tanks such as the Type 62, Type 59 tank., BTR-60, Type 60 artillery, amphibious tanks (such as the PT-76) and integrated into new war doctrines as a mobile combined-arms force. The PAVN started receiving experimental Soviet weapons against ARVN forces, including MANPADS 9K32 Strela-2 and anti-tank missiles, 9M14 Malyutka. By 1975, they had fully transformed from the strategy of mobile light-infantry and using the people's war concept used against the United States.

The US service rifle was initially the M14. The M14 was a powerful, accurate rifle, but it was heavy, hard-recoiling, and especially unwieldy in jungle fighting, as it was unsuited for the combat conditions, often suffering from feed failure. It was gradually replaced by the M16 rifle, designed by Eugene Stoner, between 1964 and 1970. When first deployed, the M16 also suffered from a propensity to jam in combat, leaving the soldier defenseless and potentially killing him. According to a congressional report, the jamming was not related to operator error or to an inherent flaw in the rifle, but instead due to a change in the gunpowder to be used in the rifle's cartridges, which led to rapid powder fouling of the action and failures to extract or feed cartridges. This decision, made after "inadequate testing", proved that "the safety of soldiers was a secondary consideration." The issue was solved in early 1968 with the issuance of the M16A1, featuring a chrome-plated bore, which reduced fouling, and the introduction of a cleaner-burning powder. Incorporating features from the German FG-42 and MG-42, the U.S. replaced their earlier M1919 Browning in most roles with the M60 machine gun, including on helicopters where it was used for suppressive fire. While its issues were not as severe as they were in the M14 or M16, the M60 still could fail to fire at crucial times – spent casings could get stuck inside of the chamber, meaning the barrel would have to be replaced before it could fire again.

The AC-130 "Spectre" Gunship and the UH-1 "Huey" gunship were used frequently by the U.S. during the war. The AC-130 was a heavily armed ground-attack aircraft variant of the C-130 Hercules transport plane, while the Huey is a military helicopter powered by a single, turboshaft engine; approximately 7,000 UH-1 aircraft saw service in Vietnam. The U.S. heavily armored, 90 mm M48A3 Patton tank saw extensive action during the Vietnam War, and over 600 were deployed with U.S. Forces. US ground forces also had access to B-52 and F-4 Phantom II and other aircraft to launch napalm, white phosphorus, tear gas, chemical weapons, precision-guided munition and cluster bombs.

Radio communications

The Vietnam War was the first conflict where U.S. forces had secure voice communication equipment available at the tactical level. The National Security Agency ran a crash program to provide U.S. forces with a family of security equipment, codenamed NESTOR, fielding 17,000 units initially; eventually 30,000 units were produced. However, limitations of the units, including poor voice quality, reduced range, annoying time delays and logistical support issues, led to only one unit in ten being used. While many in the U.S. military believed that the Viet Cong and PAVN would not be able to exploit insecure communications, interrogation of captured communication intelligence units showed they could understand the jargon and codes used in real time and were often able to warn their side of impending U.S. actions.

Extent of U.S. bombings

The U.S. dropped over 7 million tons of bombs on Indochina during the war, more than triple the 2.1 million tons of bombs the U.S. dropped on Europe and Asia during all of World War II and more than ten times the amount dropped by the U.S. during the Korean War. 500 thousand tons were dropped on Cambodia, 1 million tons were dropped on North Vietnam, and 4 million tons were dropped on South Vietnam. On a per capita basis, the 2 million tons dropped on Laos make it the most heavily bombed country in history; The New York Times noted this was "nearly a ton for every person in Laos." Due to the particularly heavy impact of cluster bombs during this war, Laos was a strong advocate of the Convention on Cluster Munitions to ban the weapons, and was host to the First Meeting of States Parties to the convention in November 2010.

Former U.S. Air Force official Earl Tilford has recounted "repeated bombing runs of a lake in central Cambodia. The B-52s literally dropped their payloads in the lake." The Air Force ran many missions of this kind to secure additional funding during budget negotiations, so the tonnage expended does not directly correlate with the resulting damage.

Aftermath

In Southeast Asia

In Vietnam 

On 2 July 1976, North and South Vietnam were merged to form the Socialist Republic of Vietnam. Despite speculation that the victorious North Vietnamese would, in President Nixon's words, "massacre the civilians there [South Vietnam] by the millions," there is a widespread consensus that no mass executions took place. However, in the years following the war, a vast number of South Vietnamese were sent to re-education camps where many endured torture, starvation, and disease while being forced to perform hard labor. According to Amnesty International Report 1979, this figure varied considerably depend on different observers: "...included such figures as "50,000 to 80,000" (Le Monde, 19 April 1978), "150,000" (Reuters from Bien Hoa, 2 November 1977), "150,000 to 200,000" (The Washington Post, 20 December 1978), and "300,000" (Agence France Presse from Hanoi, 12 February 1978)." Such variations may be because "Some estimates may include not only detainees but also people sent from the cities to the countryside." According to a native observer, 443,360 people had to register for a period in re-education camps in Saigon alone, and while some of them were released after a few days, others stayed there for more than a decade. Between 1975 and 1980, more than 1 million northerners migrated south to regions formerly in the Republic of Vietnam, while, as part of the New Economic Zones program, around 750,000 to over 1 million southerners were moved mostly to uninhabited mountainous forested areas.

Gabriel García Márquez, a Nobel Prize winning writer, described South Vietnam as a "False paradise" after the war, when he visited in 1980:

The U.S. used its security council veto to block Vietnam's recognition by the United Nations three times, an obstacle to the country receiving international aid.

Laos and Cambodia 
By 1975, the North Vietnamese had lost influence over the Khmer Rouge. Phnom Penh, the capital of Cambodia, fell to the Khmer Rouge on 17 April 1975. Under the leadership of Pol Pot, the Khmer Rouge would eventually kill 1–3 million Cambodians out of a population of around 8 million, in one of the bloodiest genocides in history.

The relationship between Vietnam and Democratic Kampuchea (Cambodia) escalated right after the end of the war. In response to the Khmer Rouge taking over Phu Quoc on 17 April and Tho Chu on 4 May 1975 and the belief that they were responsible for the disappearance of 500 Vietnamese natives on Tho Chu, Vietnam launched a counterattack to take back these islands. After several failed attempts to negotiate by both sides, Vietnam invaded Democratic Kampuchea in 1978 and ousted the Khmer Rouge, who were being supported by China, in the Cambodian–Vietnamese War. In response, China invaded Vietnam in 1979. The two countries fought a brief border war, known as the Sino-Vietnamese War. From 1978 to 1979, some 450,000 ethnic Chinese left Vietnam by boat as refugees or were expelled.

The Pathet Lao overthrew the monarchy of Laos in December 1975, establishing the Lao People's Democratic Republic under the leadership of a member of the royal family, Souphanouvong. The change in regime was "quite peaceful, a sort of Asiatic 'velvet revolution'"—although 30,000 former officials were sent to reeducation camps, often enduring harsh conditions for several years. The conflict between Hmong rebels and the Pathet Lao continued in isolated pockets.

Unexploded ordnance 
Unexploded ordnance, mostly from U.S. bombing, continues to detonate and kill people today and has rendered much land hazardous and impossible to cultivate. According to the Vietnamese government, ordnance has killed some 42,000 people since the war officially ended. In Laos, 80 million bombs failed to explode and remain scattered throughout the country. According to the government of Laos, unexploded ordnance has killed or injured over 20,000 Laotians since the end of the war and currently 50 people are killed or maimed every year. It is estimated that the explosives still remaining buried in the ground will not be removed entirely for the next few centuries.

Refugee crisis 

Over 3 million people left Vietnam, Laos, and Cambodia in the Indochina refugee crisis after 1975. Most Asian countries were unwilling to accept these refugees, many of whom fled by boat and were known as boat people. Between 1975 and 1998, an estimated 1.2 million refugees from Vietnam and other Southeast Asian countries resettled in the United States, while Canada, Australia, and France resettled over 500,000. China accepted 250,000 people. Of all the countries of Indochina, Laos experienced the largest refugee flight in proportional terms, as 300,000 people out of a total population of 3 million crossed the border into Thailand. Included among their ranks were "about 90 percent" of Laos's "intellectuals, technicians, and officials." An estimated 200,000 to 400,000 Vietnamese boat people died at sea, according to the United Nations High Commissioner for Refugees.

In the United States

Failure of U.S. goals in the war is often placed at different institutions and levels. Some have suggested that the failure of the war was due to political failures of U.S. leadership. Others point to a failure of U.S. military doctrine. Secretary of Defense Robert McNamara stated that "the achievement of a military victory by U.S. forces in Vietnam was indeed a dangerous illusion." The inability to bring Hanoi to the bargaining table by bombing also illustrated another U.S. miscalculation, and demonstrated the limitations of U.S. military abilities in achieving political goals. As Army Chief of Staff Harold Keith Johnson noted, "if anything came out of Vietnam, it was that air power couldn't do the job." General William Westmoreland admitted that the bombing had been ineffective, saying he doubted "that the North Vietnamese would have relented." U.S. Secretary of State Henry Kissinger wrote in a secret memo to President Gerald Ford that "in terms of military tactics … our armed forces are not suited to this kind of war. Even the Special Forces who had been designed for it could not prevail."

Hanoi had persistently sought unification of the country since the Geneva Accords, and the effects of U.S. bombings had negligible impact on the goals of the North Vietnamese government. The effects of U.S. bombing campaigns had mobilised the people throughout North Vietnam and mobilised international support for North Vietnam due to the perception of a super-power attempting to bomb a significantly smaller, agrarian society into submission.

In the post-war era, Americans struggled to absorb the lessons of the military intervention. President Ronald Reagan coined the term "Vietnam Syndrome" to describe the reluctance of the American public and politicians to support further military interventions abroad after Vietnam. U.S. public polling in 1978 revealed that nearly 72% of Americans believed the war was "fundamentally wrong and immoral."

The Vietnam War POW/MIA issue, concerning the fate of U.S. service personnel listed as missing in action, persisted for many years after the war's conclusion. The costs of the war loom large in American popular consciousness; a 1990 poll showed that the public incorrectly believed that more Americans lost their lives in Vietnam than in World War II.

Financial cost

Between 1953 and 1975, the United States was estimated to have spent $168 billion on the war (equivalent to $ trillion in ). This resulted in a large federal budget deficit. Other figures point to $138.9 billion from 1965 to 1974 (not inflation-adjusted), 10 times all education spending in the US and 50 times more than housing and community development spending within that time period. General record-keeping was reported to have been sloppy for government spending during the war. It was stated that war-spending could have paid off every mortgage in the US at that time, with money leftover.

As of 2013, the U.S. government is paying Vietnam veterans and their families or survivors more than $22 billion a year in war-related claims.

Impact on the U.S. military

More than 3 million Americans served in the Vietnam War, some 1.5 million of whom actually saw combat in Vietnam. James E. Westheider wrote that "At the height of American involvement in 1968, for example, 543,000 American military personnel were stationed in Vietnam, but only 80,000 were considered combat troops." Conscription in the United States had been controlled by the president since World War II, but ended in 1973.

By the war's end, 58,220 American soldiers had been killed, more than 150,000 had been wounded, and at least 21,000 had been permanently disabled. The average age of the U.S. troops killed in Vietnam was 23.11 years. According to Dale Kueter, "Of those killed in combat, 86.3 percent were white, 12.5 percent were black and the remainder from other races." Approximately 830,000 Vietnam veterans suffered some degree of posttraumatic stress disorder (PTSD). Vietnam veterans suffered from PTSD in unprecedented numbers, as many as 15.2% of Vietnam veterans, because the U.S. military had routinely provided heavy psychoactive drugs, including amphetamines, to American servicemen, which left them unable to process adequately their traumas at the time. Drug use, racial tensions, and the growing incidence of fragging—attempting to kill unpopular officers and non-commissioned officers with grenades or other weapons—created severe problems for the U.S. military and impacted its capability of undertaking combat operations. Between 1969 and 1971 the U.S. Army recorded more than 900 attacks by troops on their own officers and NCOs with 99 killed. An estimated 125,000 Americans left for Canada to avoid the Vietnam draft, and approximately 50,000 American servicemen deserted. In 1977, United States president Jimmy Carter granted a full and unconditional pardon to all Vietnam-era draft dodgers with Proclamation 4483.

The Vietnam War called into question the U.S. Army doctrine. Marine Corps general Victor H. Krulak heavily criticised Westmoreland's attrition strategy, calling it "wasteful of American lives... with small likelihood of a successful outcome." In addition, doubts surfaced about the ability of the military to train foreign forces. Furthermore, throughout the war there was found to be considerable flaws and dishonesty by officers and commanders due to promotions being tied to the body count system touted by Westmoreland and McNamara. And behind the scenes Secretary of Defense McNamara wrote in a memo to President Johnson his doubts about the war: "The picture of the world's greatest superpower killing or seriously injuring 1,000 noncombatants a week, while trying to pound a tiny backward nation into submission on an issue whose merits are hotly disputed, is not a pretty one."

Effects of U.S. chemical defoliation

One of the most controversial aspects of the U.S. military effort in Southeast Asia was the widespread use of chemical defoliants between 1961 and 1971. 20 million gallons of toxic herbicides (like Agent Orange) were sprayed on 6 million acres of forests and crops by the U.S. Air Force. They were used to defoliate large parts of the countryside to prevent the Viet Cong from being able to hide weaponry and encampments under the foliage, and to deprive them of food. Defoliation was also used to clear sensitive areas, including base perimeters and possible ambush sites along roads and canals. More than 20% of South Vietnam's forests and 3.2% of its cultivated land was sprayed at least once. 90% of herbicide use was directed at forest defoliation. The chemicals used continue to change the landscape, cause diseases and birth defects, and poison the food chain.

Agent Orange and other similar chemical substances used by the U.S. have also caused a considerable number of deaths and injuries in the intervening years, including among the US Air Force crews that handled them. Scientific reports have concluded that refugees exposed to chemical sprays while in South Vietnam continued to experience pain in the eyes and skin as well as gastrointestinal upsets. In one study, ninety-two percent of participants suffered incessant fatigue; others reported monstrous births. Meta-analyses of the most current studies on the association between Agent Orange and birth defects have found a statistically significant correlation such that having a parent who was exposed to Agent Orange at any point in their life will increase one's likelihood of either possessing or acting as a genetic carrier of birth defects. Although a variety of birth defects have been observed, the most common deformity appears to be spina bifida. Chloro-dioxins, which are inevitably formed as a byproduct of Agent Orange synthesis, are highly teratogenic, and there is substantial evidence that the birth defects carry on for three generations or more. In 2012, the United States and Vietnam began a cooperative cleaning up of the toxic chemical on part of Danang International Airport, marking the first time Washington has been involved in cleaning up Agent Orange in Vietnam.

Vietnamese victims affected by Agent Orange attempted a class action lawsuit against Dow Chemical and other U.S. chemical manufacturers, but the District Court dismissed their case. They appealed, but the dismissal was cemented in February 2008 by the Court of Appeals for the Second Circuit. , the Vietnamese government estimates that there are over 4,000,000 victims of dioxin poisoning in Vietnam, although the United States government denies any conclusive scientific links between Agent Orange and the Vietnamese victims of dioxin poisoning. In some areas of southern Vietnam, dioxin levels remain at over 100 times the accepted international standard.

The U.S. Veterans Administration has listed prostate cancer, respiratory cancers, multiple myeloma, Diabetes mellitus type 2, B-cell lymphomas, soft-tissue sarcoma, chloracne, porphyria cutanea tarda, peripheral neuropathy and spina bifida in children of veterans exposed to Agent Orange.

Casualties 

Estimates of the number of casualties vary, with one source suggesting up to 3.8 million violent war deaths in Vietnam for the period 1955 to 2002. A detailed demographic study calculated 791,000–1,141,000 war-related deaths during the war for all of Vietnam, for both military and civilians. Between 195,000 and 430,000 South Vietnamese civilians died in the war. Extrapolating from a 1969 US intelligence report, Guenter Lewy estimated 65,000 North Vietnamese civilians died in the war. Estimates of civilian deaths caused by American bombing of North Vietnam in Operation Rolling Thunder range from 30,000 to 182,000. A 1975 US Senate subcommittee estimated 1.4 million South Vietnamese civilians casualties during the war, including 415,000 deaths.

The military forces of South Vietnam suffered an estimated 254,256 killed between 1960 and 1974 and additional deaths from 1954 to 1959 and in 1975. Other estimates point to higher figures of 313,000 casualties. The official US Department of Defense figure was 950,765 PAVN/VC forces killed in Vietnam from 1965 to 1974. Defense Department officials believed that these body count figures need to be deflated by 30 percent. Guenter Lewy asserts that one-third of the reported "enemy" killed may have been civilians, concluding that the actual number of deaths of PAVN/VC military forces was probably closer to 444,000.

According to figures released by the Vietnamese government there were 849,018 confirmed military deaths on the PAVN/VC side during the war. The Vietnamese government released its estimate of war deaths for the more lengthy period of 1955 to 1975. This figure includes battle deaths of Vietnamese soldiers in the Laotian and Cambodian Civil Wars, in which the PAVN was a major participant. Non-combat deaths account for 30 to 40% of these figures. However, the figures do not include deaths of South Vietnamese and allied soldiers. These do not include the estimated 300,000–500,000 PAVN/VC missing in action. Official figures from the Vietnamese government estimate 1.1 million dead and 300,000 missing from 1945 to 1979, with approximately 849,000 dead and 232,000 missing from 1960 to 1975.

US reports of "enemy KIA", referred to as body count were thought to have been subject to "falsification and glorification", and a true estimate of PAVN/VC combat deaths may be difficult to assess, as US victories were assessed by having a "greater kill ratio". It was difficult to distinguish between civilians and military personnel on the Viet Cong side as many persons were part-time guerrillas or impressed labourers who did not wear uniforms and civilians killed were sometimes written off as enemy killed because high enemy casualties was directly tied to promotions and commendation.

Between 275,000 and 310,000 Cambodians were estimated to have died during the war including between 50,000 and 150,000 combatants and civilians from US bombings. 20,000–62,000 Laotians also died, and 58,281 U.S. military personnel were killed, of which 1,584 are still listed as missing as of March 2021.

Legacy

In popular culture

The Vietnam War has been featured extensively in television, film, video games, music and literature in the participant countries. In Vietnam, one notable film set during Operation Linebacker II was the film Girl from Hanoi (1974) depicting war-time life in Hanoi. Another notable work was the diary of Đặng Thùy Trâm, a North Vietnamese doctor who enlisted in the Southern battlefield, and was killed at the age of 27 by U.S. forces near Quảng Ngãi. Her diaries were later published in Vietnam as Đặng Thùy Trâm's Diary (Last Night I Dreamed of Peace), where it became a best-seller and was later made into a film Don't Burn (Đừng đốt). In Vietnam, the diary has often been compared to The Diary of Anne Frank, and both are used in literary education. Another Vietnamese film produced was The Abandoned Field: Free Fire Zone (Cánh đồng hoang) in 1979 which weaves the narrative of living on the ground in a US "free-fire zone" as well as perspectives from US helicopters.

One of the first major films based on the Vietnam War was John Wayne's pro-war The Green Berets (1968). Further cinematic representations were released during the 1970s and 1980s, some of the most noteworthy examples being Michael Cimino's The Deer Hunter (1978), Francis Ford Coppola's Apocalypse Now (1979), Oliver Stone's Platoon (1986) – based on his service in the U.S. Army during the Vietnam War, Stanley Kubrick's Full Metal Jacket (1987). Other Vietnam War films include Hamburger Hill (1987), Casualties of War (1989), Born on the Fourth of July (1989), The Siege of Firebase Gloria (1989), Forrest Gump (1994), We Were Soldiers (2002) and Rescue Dawn (2007).

The war also influenced a generation of musicians and songwriters in Vietnam, the United States, and throughout the world, both pro/anti-war and pro/anti-communist, with the Vietnam War Song Project having identified 5,000+ songs about or referencing the conflict. The band Country Joe and the Fish recorded The "Fish" Cheer/I-Feel-Like-I'm-Fixin'-to-Die Rag in 1965, and it became one of the most influential anti-Vietnam protest anthems. Many songwriters and musicians supported the anti-war movement, including Pete Seeger, Joan Baez, Bob Dylan, Peggy Seeger, Ewan MacColl, Barbara Dane, The Critics Group, Phil Ochs, John Lennon, John Fogerty, Nina Simone, Neil Young, Tom Paxton, Jimmy Cliff and Arlo Guthrie. The modern classical composer George Crumb composed a string quartet, a threnody, regarding the war in 1970 titled Black Angels.

Myths 

Myths play a central role in the historiography of the Vietnam War, and have become a part of the culture of the United States. Much like the general historiography of the war, discussion of myth has focused on U.S. experiences, but changing myths of war have also played a role in Vietnamese and Australian historiography.

Recent scholarship has focused on "myth-busting", attacking the previous orthodox and revisionist schools of American historiography of the Vietnam War. This scholarship challenges myths about American society and soldiery in the Vietnam War.

Kuzmarov in The Myth of the Addicted Army: Vietnam and the Modern War on Drugs challenges the popular and Hollywood narrative that US soldiers were heavy drug users, in particular the notion that the My Lai massacre was caused by drug use. According to Kuzmarov, Richard Nixon is primarily responsible for creating the drug myth.

Michael Allen in Until The Last Man Comes Home also accuses Nixon of myth making, by exploiting the plight of the League of Wives of American Prisoners in Vietnam and the National League of Families of American Prisoners and Missing in Southeast Asia to allow the government to appear caring as the war was increasingly considered lost. Allen's analysis ties the position of potential missing or prisoner Americans into post-war politics and recent presidential elections, including the Swift boat controversy in US electoral politics.

Commemoration

On 25 May 2012, President Barack Obama issued a proclamation of the commemoration of the 50th Anniversary of the Vietnam War. On 10 November 2017, President Donald Trump issued an additional proclamation commemorating the 50th Anniversary of the Vietnam War.

See also

 History of Cambodia
 History of Laos
 History of Vietnam
 List of conflicts in Asia
 Opposition to United States involvement in the Vietnam War
 U.S. news media and the Vietnam War
 Third Indochina War
 Sino-Vietnamese War
 The Vietnam War (TV series)
 Soviet–Afghan War

Annotations

References 

The references for this article are grouped in three sections.
 Citations: references for the in-line, numbered superscript references contained within the article.
 Main sources: the main works used to build the content of the article, but not referenced as in-line citations.
 Additional sources: additional works used to build the article

Citations

Works cited

Main sources

 Central Intelligence Agency. "Laos". The World Factbook.
  Materials related to war resistance and peace activism movements during the Vietnam War.
 Foreign Relations of the United States
 
 
 
 
 
  Autobiography of controversial former Chief of Staff of the United States Air Force.
 
 
 
 
  5 volumes. Combination of narrative and secret documents compiled by Pentagon.
 Public Papers of the Presidents, 1965 (1966). Official documents of U.S. presidents.
  A first-hand account of the Kennedy administration by one of his principal advisors.
  Describes the geopolitical situation of Cambodia.
 United States – Vietnam Relations, 1945–1967: A Study Prepared by the Department of Defense. Washington, D.C.: Office of the Secretary of Defense, 1971, 12 volumes.

Additional sources

 
 Angio, Joe. Nixon a Presidency Revealed (2007) The History Channel television documentary
 
 
 Baker, Kevin. "Stabbed in the Back! The past and future of a right-wing myth", Harper's Magazine (June 2006) 
 
 
 Blaufarb Douglas S. The Counterinsurgency Era (1977). A history of the Kennedy Administration's involvement in South Vietnam.
 Brigham, Robert K. Battlefield Vietnam: A Brief History. A PBS interactive website.
 
 
 
 
  a Washington insider's memoir of events.
 
 
 
 
 
 
 
 
 
 
 
 
 
 
 
 
 
 
 
 
 
 
 
 
 
 
 
 
 
 
 
 
 
 
 
 
  textbook.
 
 
  official medical history
 
 
 
 
  Narrative military history by a senior U.S. general.
 
 
 
 
 Schell, Jonathan. The Time of Illusion (1976).
 Schulzinger, Robert D. A Time for War: The United States and Vietnam, 1941–1975 (1997).
 
 Sorley, Lewis, A Better War: The Unexamined Victories and Final Tragedy of America's Last Years in Vietnam (1999), based upon still classified tape-recorded meetings of top level US commanders in Vietnam, 
 Spector, Ronald. After Tet: The Bloodiest Year in Vietnam (1992), very broad coverage of 1968.
 
 
 Summers, Harry G. On Strategy: A Critical Analysis of the Vietnam War, Presidio press (1982),  (225 pages)
 
 Tucker, Spencer. ed. Encyclopedia of the Vietnam War (1998) 3 vol. reference set; also one-volume abridgement (2001).
 
 
 
 
 
 Xiaoming, Zhang. "China's 1979 War With Vietnam: A Reassessment", China Quarterly. Issue no. 184, (December 2005)

Historiography and memory

 
 
 Olson, James Stuart, ed. The Vietnam War: Handbook of the literature and research (Greenwood, 1993) excerpt.

Further reading
 
 
 
 Kolbert, Elizabeth, "This Close; The day the Cuban missile crisis almost went nuclear" (a review of Martin J. Sherwin's Gambling with Armageddon: Nuclear Roulette from Hiroshima to the Cuban Missile Crisis, New York, Knopf, 2020), The New Yorker, 12 October 2020, pp. 70–73. Kolbert writes: "[On taking office as President, Lyndon] Johnson wasn't informed that... President [Kennedy] had traded away American [nuclear] warheads [in Turkey in order to resolve the Cuban Missile Crisis]. The lesson L.B.J. seems to have drawn... was that Kennedy had succeeded by refusing to compromise [with the Soviets]. This would have deeply unfortunate consequences when it came time for Johnson to deal with North Vietnam." (p. 72.)
  (Review of Max Hastings, Vietnam: An Epic Tragedy, 1945–75, Collins, 2019, 722 pp.)
  Full-scale history of the war by U.S. Army; much broader than title suggests.

External links

 A Vietnam Diary's Homecoming Video produced by the PBS Series History Detectives
 Detailed bibliography of Vietnam War
 Documents Relating to American Foreign Policy–Vietnam  primary sources on U.S. involvement
 Fallout of the War from the Dean Peter Krogh Foreign Affairs Digital Archives
 Glossary of Military Terms & Slang from the Vietnam War
 Impressions of Vietnam and descriptions of the daily life of a soldier from the oral history of Elliott Gardner, U.S. Army 
 Stephen H. Warner Southeast Asia Photograph Collection at Gettysburg College
 Timeline US – Vietnam (1947–2001) in Open-Content project
 The U.S. Army in Vietnam the official history of the United States Army
 The Vietnam War at The History Channel
 UC Berkeley Library Social Activism Sound Recording Project: Anti-Vietnam War Protests
 Vietnam war timeline comprehensive timeline of the Vietnam War
 Virtual Vietnam Archive – Texas Tech University
 1965–1975 Another Vietnam; Unseen images of the war from the winning side – Mashable
 Archival collections about the Vietnam War, University Archives and Special Collections, Joseph P. Healey Library, University of Massachusetts Boston

 
1950s conflicts
1960s conflicts
1970s conflicts
Cambodian Civil War
Cold War conflicts
Communism-based civil wars
History of Vietnam
Imperialism
2
Laotian Civil War
Presidency of Dwight D. Eisenhower
Presidency of John F. Kennedy
Presidency of Lyndon B. Johnson
Presidency of Richard Nixon
Presidency of Gerald Ford
Proxy wars
Revolution-based civil wars

Wars involving Albania
Wars involving Australia
Wars involving Cambodia
Wars involving Laos
Wars involving New Zealand
Wars involving North Korea
Wars involving South Korea
Wars involving Thailand
Wars involving the People's Republic of China
Wars involving the Philippines
Wars involving the Soviet Union
Wars involving the United States
Wars involving South Vietnam
Wars involving Vietnam
Articles containing video clips
1955 in Vietnam
1956 in Vietnam
1957 in Vietnam
1958 in Vietnam
1959 in Vietnam
1960 in Vietnam
1961 in Vietnam
1962 in Vietnam
1963 in Vietnam
1964 in Vietnam
1965 in Vietnam
1966 in Vietnam
1967 in Vietnam
1968 in Vietnam
1969 in Vietnam
1970 in Vietnam
1971 in Vietnam
1972 in Vietnam
1973 in Vietnam
1974 in Vietnam
1975 in Vietnam